

296001–296100 

|-bgcolor=#d6d6d6
| 296001 ||  || — || December 29, 2008 || Mount Lemmon || Mount Lemmon Survey || KOR || align=right | 1.3 km || 
|-id=002 bgcolor=#fefefe
| 296002 ||  || — || December 29, 2008 || Kitt Peak || Spacewatch || — || align=right | 1.0 km || 
|-id=003 bgcolor=#fefefe
| 296003 ||  || — || December 29, 2008 || Kitt Peak || Spacewatch || — || align=right | 1.0 km || 
|-id=004 bgcolor=#E9E9E9
| 296004 ||  || — || December 29, 2008 || Kitt Peak || Spacewatch || — || align=right | 2.0 km || 
|-id=005 bgcolor=#fefefe
| 296005 ||  || — || December 29, 2008 || Kitt Peak || Spacewatch || NYS || align=right data-sort-value="0.74" | 740 m || 
|-id=006 bgcolor=#E9E9E9
| 296006 ||  || — || December 29, 2008 || Kitt Peak || Spacewatch || AGN || align=right | 1.7 km || 
|-id=007 bgcolor=#fefefe
| 296007 ||  || — || December 29, 2008 || Kitt Peak || Spacewatch || — || align=right data-sort-value="0.99" | 990 m || 
|-id=008 bgcolor=#fefefe
| 296008 ||  || — || December 29, 2008 || Mount Lemmon || Mount Lemmon Survey || — || align=right | 1.1 km || 
|-id=009 bgcolor=#d6d6d6
| 296009 ||  || — || December 29, 2008 || Kitt Peak || Spacewatch || — || align=right | 3.8 km || 
|-id=010 bgcolor=#d6d6d6
| 296010 ||  || — || December 30, 2008 || Kitt Peak || Spacewatch || — || align=right | 3.0 km || 
|-id=011 bgcolor=#E9E9E9
| 296011 ||  || — || December 30, 2008 || Kitt Peak || Spacewatch || — || align=right | 2.7 km || 
|-id=012 bgcolor=#E9E9E9
| 296012 ||  || — || December 30, 2008 || Kitt Peak || Spacewatch || — || align=right | 2.3 km || 
|-id=013 bgcolor=#fefefe
| 296013 ||  || — || December 30, 2008 || Kitt Peak || Spacewatch || — || align=right | 1.0 km || 
|-id=014 bgcolor=#fefefe
| 296014 ||  || — || December 30, 2008 || Kitt Peak || Spacewatch || FLO || align=right data-sort-value="0.79" | 790 m || 
|-id=015 bgcolor=#E9E9E9
| 296015 ||  || — || December 30, 2008 || Kitt Peak || Spacewatch || EUN || align=right | 1.7 km || 
|-id=016 bgcolor=#E9E9E9
| 296016 ||  || — || December 30, 2008 || La Sagra || OAM Obs. || EUN || align=right | 1.8 km || 
|-id=017 bgcolor=#d6d6d6
| 296017 ||  || — || December 30, 2008 || Kitt Peak || Spacewatch || EOS || align=right | 3.3 km || 
|-id=018 bgcolor=#fefefe
| 296018 ||  || — || December 31, 2008 || Kitt Peak || Spacewatch || — || align=right | 1.0 km || 
|-id=019 bgcolor=#E9E9E9
| 296019 ||  || — || December 21, 2008 || Kitt Peak || Spacewatch || HEN || align=right | 1.1 km || 
|-id=020 bgcolor=#d6d6d6
| 296020 ||  || — || December 22, 2008 || Kitt Peak || Spacewatch || KOR || align=right | 1.5 km || 
|-id=021 bgcolor=#E9E9E9
| 296021 ||  || — || December 22, 2008 || Mount Lemmon || Mount Lemmon Survey || — || align=right | 1.7 km || 
|-id=022 bgcolor=#fefefe
| 296022 ||  || — || December 21, 2008 || Kitt Peak || Spacewatch || — || align=right | 1.0 km || 
|-id=023 bgcolor=#E9E9E9
| 296023 ||  || — || December 22, 2008 || Mount Lemmon || Mount Lemmon Survey || — || align=right | 1.1 km || 
|-id=024 bgcolor=#E9E9E9
| 296024 ||  || — || December 22, 2008 || Mount Lemmon || Mount Lemmon Survey || — || align=right data-sort-value="0.88" | 880 m || 
|-id=025 bgcolor=#d6d6d6
| 296025 ||  || — || December 22, 2008 || Kitt Peak || Spacewatch || KAR || align=right | 1.3 km || 
|-id=026 bgcolor=#fefefe
| 296026 ||  || — || December 22, 2008 || Kitt Peak || Spacewatch || V || align=right data-sort-value="0.76" | 760 m || 
|-id=027 bgcolor=#d6d6d6
| 296027 ||  || — || December 31, 2008 || Kitt Peak || Spacewatch || LIX || align=right | 4.4 km || 
|-id=028 bgcolor=#d6d6d6
| 296028 ||  || — || December 30, 2008 || Mount Lemmon || Mount Lemmon Survey || KOR || align=right | 1.7 km || 
|-id=029 bgcolor=#d6d6d6
| 296029 ||  || — || December 30, 2008 || Mount Lemmon || Mount Lemmon Survey || — || align=right | 3.7 km || 
|-id=030 bgcolor=#d6d6d6
| 296030 ||  || — || December 22, 2008 || Mount Lemmon || Mount Lemmon Survey || — || align=right | 2.8 km || 
|-id=031 bgcolor=#E9E9E9
| 296031 ||  || — || December 19, 2008 || Socorro || LINEAR || — || align=right | 2.0 km || 
|-id=032 bgcolor=#E9E9E9
| 296032 ||  || — || December 19, 2008 || Socorro || LINEAR || ADE || align=right | 3.4 km || 
|-id=033 bgcolor=#E9E9E9
| 296033 ||  || — || December 21, 2008 || Socorro || LINEAR || — || align=right | 2.2 km || 
|-id=034 bgcolor=#d6d6d6
| 296034 ||  || — || December 22, 2008 || Kitt Peak || Spacewatch || — || align=right | 3.2 km || 
|-id=035 bgcolor=#fefefe
| 296035 ||  || — || December 28, 2008 || Socorro || LINEAR || V || align=right data-sort-value="0.84" | 840 m || 
|-id=036 bgcolor=#E9E9E9
| 296036 ||  || — || December 21, 2008 || Kitt Peak || Spacewatch || — || align=right | 1.1 km || 
|-id=037 bgcolor=#fefefe
| 296037 ||  || — || December 21, 2008 || Kitt Peak || Spacewatch || — || align=right | 1.0 km || 
|-id=038 bgcolor=#d6d6d6
| 296038 ||  || — || December 22, 2008 || Mount Lemmon || Mount Lemmon Survey || — || align=right | 4.5 km || 
|-id=039 bgcolor=#d6d6d6
| 296039 || 2009 AB || — || January 1, 2009 || Mayhill || A. Lowe || — || align=right | 2.5 km || 
|-id=040 bgcolor=#E9E9E9
| 296040 ||  || — || January 2, 2009 || Purple Mountain || PMO NEO || AGN || align=right | 1.6 km || 
|-id=041 bgcolor=#d6d6d6
| 296041 ||  || — || January 1, 2009 || Kitt Peak || Spacewatch || — || align=right | 2.8 km || 
|-id=042 bgcolor=#E9E9E9
| 296042 ||  || — || January 1, 2009 || Kitt Peak || Spacewatch || — || align=right | 2.7 km || 
|-id=043 bgcolor=#fefefe
| 296043 ||  || — || January 2, 2009 || Mount Lemmon || Mount Lemmon Survey || V || align=right | 1.1 km || 
|-id=044 bgcolor=#E9E9E9
| 296044 ||  || — || January 15, 2009 || Socorro || LINEAR || EUN || align=right | 1.9 km || 
|-id=045 bgcolor=#d6d6d6
| 296045 ||  || — || January 2, 2009 || Mount Lemmon || Mount Lemmon Survey || — || align=right | 3.6 km || 
|-id=046 bgcolor=#E9E9E9
| 296046 ||  || — || January 2, 2009 || Mount Lemmon || Mount Lemmon Survey || — || align=right | 2.8 km || 
|-id=047 bgcolor=#d6d6d6
| 296047 ||  || — || January 3, 2009 || Kitt Peak || Spacewatch || EOS || align=right | 4.8 km || 
|-id=048 bgcolor=#fefefe
| 296048 ||  || — || January 3, 2009 || Kitt Peak || Spacewatch || NYS || align=right data-sort-value="0.66" | 660 m || 
|-id=049 bgcolor=#fefefe
| 296049 ||  || — || January 3, 2009 || Kitt Peak || Spacewatch || — || align=right data-sort-value="0.94" | 940 m || 
|-id=050 bgcolor=#E9E9E9
| 296050 ||  || — || January 2, 2009 || Kitt Peak || Spacewatch || — || align=right | 1.7 km || 
|-id=051 bgcolor=#d6d6d6
| 296051 ||  || — || January 2, 2009 || Kitt Peak || Spacewatch || THM || align=right | 2.6 km || 
|-id=052 bgcolor=#d6d6d6
| 296052 ||  || — || January 8, 2009 || Kitt Peak || Spacewatch || — || align=right | 3.3 km || 
|-id=053 bgcolor=#d6d6d6
| 296053 ||  || — || January 8, 2009 || Kitt Peak || Spacewatch || THM || align=right | 2.3 km || 
|-id=054 bgcolor=#d6d6d6
| 296054 ||  || — || January 15, 2009 || Kitt Peak || Spacewatch || 7:4 || align=right | 3.3 km || 
|-id=055 bgcolor=#fefefe
| 296055 ||  || — || January 15, 2009 || Kitt Peak || Spacewatch || — || align=right data-sort-value="0.63" | 630 m || 
|-id=056 bgcolor=#d6d6d6
| 296056 ||  || — || January 15, 2009 || Kitt Peak || Spacewatch || HYG || align=right | 4.0 km || 
|-id=057 bgcolor=#fefefe
| 296057 ||  || — || January 15, 2009 || Kitt Peak || Spacewatch || NYS || align=right data-sort-value="0.86" | 860 m || 
|-id=058 bgcolor=#d6d6d6
| 296058 ||  || — || January 15, 2009 || Kitt Peak || Spacewatch || — || align=right | 3.9 km || 
|-id=059 bgcolor=#fefefe
| 296059 ||  || — || January 15, 2009 || Kitt Peak || Spacewatch || V || align=right data-sort-value="0.95" | 950 m || 
|-id=060 bgcolor=#E9E9E9
| 296060 ||  || — || January 15, 2009 || Kitt Peak || Spacewatch || HEN || align=right | 1.1 km || 
|-id=061 bgcolor=#fefefe
| 296061 ||  || — || January 15, 2009 || Kitt Peak || Spacewatch || — || align=right | 1.1 km || 
|-id=062 bgcolor=#fefefe
| 296062 ||  || — || January 15, 2009 || Kitt Peak || Spacewatch || MAS || align=right data-sort-value="0.88" | 880 m || 
|-id=063 bgcolor=#E9E9E9
| 296063 ||  || — || January 1, 2009 || Mount Lemmon || Mount Lemmon Survey || — || align=right | 1.7 km || 
|-id=064 bgcolor=#E9E9E9
| 296064 ||  || — || January 15, 2009 || Kitt Peak || Spacewatch || ADE || align=right | 3.2 km || 
|-id=065 bgcolor=#E9E9E9
| 296065 ||  || — || January 2, 2009 || Mount Lemmon || Mount Lemmon Survey || MRX || align=right | 1.2 km || 
|-id=066 bgcolor=#fefefe
| 296066 ||  || — || January 7, 2009 || Kitt Peak || Spacewatch || CHL || align=right | 2.6 km || 
|-id=067 bgcolor=#E9E9E9
| 296067 ||  || — || January 2, 2009 || Catalina || CSS || MAR || align=right | 1.6 km || 
|-id=068 bgcolor=#d6d6d6
| 296068 ||  || — || January 1, 2009 || Kitt Peak || Spacewatch || — || align=right | 4.0 km || 
|-id=069 bgcolor=#E9E9E9
| 296069 ||  || — || January 3, 2009 || Mount Lemmon || Mount Lemmon Survey || — || align=right | 2.3 km || 
|-id=070 bgcolor=#fefefe
| 296070 ||  || — || January 1, 2009 || Kitt Peak || Spacewatch || V || align=right data-sort-value="0.93" | 930 m || 
|-id=071 bgcolor=#fefefe
| 296071 ||  || — || January 1, 2009 || Kitt Peak || Spacewatch || — || align=right | 1.1 km || 
|-id=072 bgcolor=#E9E9E9
| 296072 ||  || — || January 17, 2009 || Mayhill || A. Lowe || — || align=right | 3.2 km || 
|-id=073 bgcolor=#E9E9E9
| 296073 ||  || — || January 18, 2009 || Socorro || LINEAR || — || align=right | 2.0 km || 
|-id=074 bgcolor=#E9E9E9
| 296074 ||  || — || January 18, 2009 || Socorro || LINEAR || — || align=right | 1.4 km || 
|-id=075 bgcolor=#E9E9E9
| 296075 ||  || — || January 18, 2009 || Socorro || LINEAR || EUN || align=right | 1.7 km || 
|-id=076 bgcolor=#d6d6d6
| 296076 ||  || — || January 22, 2009 || Sandlot || G. Hug || — || align=right | 4.1 km || 
|-id=077 bgcolor=#fefefe
| 296077 ||  || — || January 17, 2009 || Socorro || LINEAR || SVE || align=right | 2.4 km || 
|-id=078 bgcolor=#E9E9E9
| 296078 ||  || — || January 17, 2009 || Socorro || LINEAR || — || align=right | 2.6 km || 
|-id=079 bgcolor=#fefefe
| 296079 ||  || — || January 24, 2009 || Purple Mountain || PMO NEO || — || align=right | 1.6 km || 
|-id=080 bgcolor=#d6d6d6
| 296080 ||  || — || January 21, 2009 || Socorro || LINEAR || TIR || align=right | 5.3 km || 
|-id=081 bgcolor=#fefefe
| 296081 ||  || — || January 21, 2009 || Socorro || LINEAR || ERI || align=right | 1.7 km || 
|-id=082 bgcolor=#d6d6d6
| 296082 ||  || — || January 25, 2009 || Marly || P. Kocher || — || align=right | 4.7 km || 
|-id=083 bgcolor=#fefefe
| 296083 ||  || — || January 27, 2009 || Socorro || LINEAR || — || align=right | 1.3 km || 
|-id=084 bgcolor=#d6d6d6
| 296084 ||  || — || January 24, 2009 || Cerro Burek || Alianza S4 Obs. || EMA || align=right | 6.0 km || 
|-id=085 bgcolor=#E9E9E9
| 296085 ||  || — || January 24, 2009 || Cerro Burek || Alianza S4 Obs. || — || align=right | 2.1 km || 
|-id=086 bgcolor=#fefefe
| 296086 ||  || — || January 16, 2009 || Mount Lemmon || Mount Lemmon Survey || — || align=right | 1.1 km || 
|-id=087 bgcolor=#fefefe
| 296087 ||  || — || January 16, 2009 || Mount Lemmon || Mount Lemmon Survey || — || align=right | 1.2 km || 
|-id=088 bgcolor=#E9E9E9
| 296088 ||  || — || January 16, 2009 || Kitt Peak || Spacewatch || — || align=right | 1.3 km || 
|-id=089 bgcolor=#d6d6d6
| 296089 ||  || — || January 17, 2009 || Kitt Peak || Spacewatch || EOS || align=right | 2.5 km || 
|-id=090 bgcolor=#fefefe
| 296090 ||  || — || January 16, 2009 || Mount Lemmon || Mount Lemmon Survey || NYS || align=right data-sort-value="0.77" | 770 m || 
|-id=091 bgcolor=#d6d6d6
| 296091 ||  || — || January 18, 2009 || Catalina || CSS || — || align=right | 4.1 km || 
|-id=092 bgcolor=#fefefe
| 296092 ||  || — || January 16, 2009 || Kitt Peak || Spacewatch || NYS || align=right | 1.1 km || 
|-id=093 bgcolor=#E9E9E9
| 296093 ||  || — || January 16, 2009 || Kitt Peak || Spacewatch || HOF || align=right | 3.3 km || 
|-id=094 bgcolor=#d6d6d6
| 296094 ||  || — || January 16, 2009 || Kitt Peak || Spacewatch || THM || align=right | 2.8 km || 
|-id=095 bgcolor=#E9E9E9
| 296095 ||  || — || January 16, 2009 || Kitt Peak || Spacewatch || — || align=right | 1.0 km || 
|-id=096 bgcolor=#fefefe
| 296096 ||  || — || January 16, 2009 || Kitt Peak || Spacewatch || NYS || align=right data-sort-value="0.83" | 830 m || 
|-id=097 bgcolor=#d6d6d6
| 296097 ||  || — || January 16, 2009 || Kitt Peak || Spacewatch || — || align=right | 4.8 km || 
|-id=098 bgcolor=#E9E9E9
| 296098 ||  || — || January 16, 2009 || Kitt Peak || Spacewatch || — || align=right | 2.9 km || 
|-id=099 bgcolor=#E9E9E9
| 296099 ||  || — || January 16, 2009 || Kitt Peak || Spacewatch || BRG || align=right | 1.9 km || 
|-id=100 bgcolor=#fefefe
| 296100 ||  || — || January 16, 2009 || Kitt Peak || Spacewatch || V || align=right data-sort-value="0.99" | 990 m || 
|}

296101–296200 

|-bgcolor=#E9E9E9
| 296101 ||  || — || January 16, 2009 || Kitt Peak || Spacewatch || AGN || align=right | 1.2 km || 
|-id=102 bgcolor=#fefefe
| 296102 ||  || — || January 16, 2009 || Kitt Peak || Spacewatch || FLO || align=right data-sort-value="0.69" | 690 m || 
|-id=103 bgcolor=#fefefe
| 296103 ||  || — || January 16, 2009 || Kitt Peak || Spacewatch || — || align=right | 1.1 km || 
|-id=104 bgcolor=#d6d6d6
| 296104 ||  || — || January 16, 2009 || Kitt Peak || Spacewatch || — || align=right | 2.4 km || 
|-id=105 bgcolor=#d6d6d6
| 296105 ||  || — || January 16, 2009 || Kitt Peak || Spacewatch || — || align=right | 3.2 km || 
|-id=106 bgcolor=#E9E9E9
| 296106 ||  || — || January 16, 2009 || Kitt Peak || Spacewatch || — || align=right | 3.0 km || 
|-id=107 bgcolor=#d6d6d6
| 296107 ||  || — || January 16, 2009 || Kitt Peak || Spacewatch || — || align=right | 6.1 km || 
|-id=108 bgcolor=#E9E9E9
| 296108 ||  || — || January 16, 2009 || Mount Lemmon || Mount Lemmon Survey || AGN || align=right | 1.7 km || 
|-id=109 bgcolor=#d6d6d6
| 296109 ||  || — || January 16, 2009 || Mount Lemmon || Mount Lemmon Survey || — || align=right | 3.2 km || 
|-id=110 bgcolor=#d6d6d6
| 296110 ||  || — || January 16, 2009 || Mount Lemmon || Mount Lemmon Survey || — || align=right | 3.0 km || 
|-id=111 bgcolor=#E9E9E9
| 296111 ||  || — || January 16, 2009 || Mount Lemmon || Mount Lemmon Survey || — || align=right | 2.9 km || 
|-id=112 bgcolor=#fefefe
| 296112 ||  || — || January 16, 2009 || Mount Lemmon || Mount Lemmon Survey || NYS || align=right | 2.5 km || 
|-id=113 bgcolor=#d6d6d6
| 296113 ||  || — || January 16, 2009 || Mount Lemmon || Mount Lemmon Survey || THM || align=right | 2.4 km || 
|-id=114 bgcolor=#d6d6d6
| 296114 ||  || — || January 16, 2009 || Mount Lemmon || Mount Lemmon Survey || CHA || align=right | 2.4 km || 
|-id=115 bgcolor=#d6d6d6
| 296115 ||  || — || January 17, 2009 || Mount Lemmon || Mount Lemmon Survey || KOR || align=right | 1.6 km || 
|-id=116 bgcolor=#fefefe
| 296116 ||  || — || January 17, 2009 || Mount Lemmon || Mount Lemmon Survey || NYS || align=right data-sort-value="0.81" | 810 m || 
|-id=117 bgcolor=#d6d6d6
| 296117 ||  || — || January 19, 2009 || Mount Lemmon || Mount Lemmon Survey || EUP || align=right | 7.4 km || 
|-id=118 bgcolor=#E9E9E9
| 296118 ||  || — || January 20, 2009 || Mount Lemmon || Mount Lemmon Survey || AGN || align=right | 1.3 km || 
|-id=119 bgcolor=#d6d6d6
| 296119 ||  || — || January 20, 2009 || Catalina || CSS || BRA || align=right | 2.2 km || 
|-id=120 bgcolor=#E9E9E9
| 296120 ||  || — || January 20, 2009 || Kitt Peak || Spacewatch || — || align=right | 2.1 km || 
|-id=121 bgcolor=#d6d6d6
| 296121 ||  || — || January 20, 2009 || Kitt Peak || Spacewatch || — || align=right | 2.3 km || 
|-id=122 bgcolor=#E9E9E9
| 296122 ||  || — || January 20, 2009 || Kitt Peak || Spacewatch || — || align=right | 2.8 km || 
|-id=123 bgcolor=#d6d6d6
| 296123 ||  || — || January 20, 2009 || Kitt Peak || Spacewatch || — || align=right | 2.8 km || 
|-id=124 bgcolor=#E9E9E9
| 296124 ||  || — || January 25, 2009 || Catalina || CSS || — || align=right | 2.3 km || 
|-id=125 bgcolor=#E9E9E9
| 296125 ||  || — || January 25, 2009 || Catalina || CSS || — || align=right | 2.5 km || 
|-id=126 bgcolor=#fefefe
| 296126 ||  || — || January 26, 2009 || Purple Mountain || PMO NEO || — || align=right | 1.2 km || 
|-id=127 bgcolor=#fefefe
| 296127 ||  || — || January 21, 2009 || Dauban || F. Kugel || — || align=right | 1.0 km || 
|-id=128 bgcolor=#d6d6d6
| 296128 ||  || — || January 28, 2009 || Dauban || F. Kugel || HYG || align=right | 3.1 km || 
|-id=129 bgcolor=#d6d6d6
| 296129 ||  || — || January 29, 2009 || Calvin-Rehoboth || L. A. Molnar || — || align=right | 3.0 km || 
|-id=130 bgcolor=#d6d6d6
| 296130 ||  || — || January 30, 2009 || Wildberg || R. Apitzsch || — || align=right | 2.4 km || 
|-id=131 bgcolor=#d6d6d6
| 296131 ||  || — || January 24, 2009 || Purple Mountain || PMO NEO || — || align=right | 3.2 km || 
|-id=132 bgcolor=#fefefe
| 296132 ||  || — || January 27, 2009 || Purple Mountain || PMO NEO || — || align=right data-sort-value="0.98" | 980 m || 
|-id=133 bgcolor=#fefefe
| 296133 ||  || — || January 18, 2009 || Sierra Stars || W. G. Dillon || NYS || align=right data-sort-value="0.79" | 790 m || 
|-id=134 bgcolor=#d6d6d6
| 296134 ||  || — || January 26, 2009 || Bergisch Gladbach || W. Bickel || — || align=right | 4.4 km || 
|-id=135 bgcolor=#d6d6d6
| 296135 ||  || — || January 25, 2009 || Kitt Peak || Spacewatch || HYG || align=right | 2.8 km || 
|-id=136 bgcolor=#E9E9E9
| 296136 ||  || — || January 25, 2009 || Kitt Peak || Spacewatch || — || align=right | 1.0 km || 
|-id=137 bgcolor=#d6d6d6
| 296137 ||  || — || January 25, 2009 || Kitt Peak || Spacewatch || — || align=right | 3.3 km || 
|-id=138 bgcolor=#E9E9E9
| 296138 ||  || — || January 25, 2009 || Kitt Peak || Spacewatch || — || align=right | 2.8 km || 
|-id=139 bgcolor=#E9E9E9
| 296139 ||  || — || January 25, 2009 || Kitt Peak || Spacewatch || — || align=right | 1.3 km || 
|-id=140 bgcolor=#fefefe
| 296140 ||  || — || January 25, 2009 || Kitt Peak || Spacewatch || MAS || align=right data-sort-value="0.88" | 880 m || 
|-id=141 bgcolor=#E9E9E9
| 296141 ||  || — || January 25, 2009 || Kitt Peak || Spacewatch || AGN || align=right | 1.6 km || 
|-id=142 bgcolor=#fefefe
| 296142 ||  || — || January 25, 2009 || Kitt Peak || Spacewatch || FLO || align=right data-sort-value="0.81" | 810 m || 
|-id=143 bgcolor=#d6d6d6
| 296143 ||  || — || January 24, 2009 || Purple Mountain || PMO NEO || — || align=right | 2.5 km || 
|-id=144 bgcolor=#fefefe
| 296144 ||  || — || January 25, 2009 || Catalina || CSS || — || align=right data-sort-value="0.87" | 870 m || 
|-id=145 bgcolor=#fefefe
| 296145 ||  || — || January 25, 2009 || Kitt Peak || Spacewatch || NYS || align=right data-sort-value="0.79" | 790 m || 
|-id=146 bgcolor=#E9E9E9
| 296146 ||  || — || January 29, 2009 || Catalina || CSS || — || align=right | 3.0 km || 
|-id=147 bgcolor=#d6d6d6
| 296147 ||  || — || January 29, 2009 || Mount Lemmon || Mount Lemmon Survey || — || align=right | 2.6 km || 
|-id=148 bgcolor=#fefefe
| 296148 ||  || — || January 25, 2009 || Kitt Peak || Spacewatch || NYS || align=right data-sort-value="0.76" | 760 m || 
|-id=149 bgcolor=#fefefe
| 296149 ||  || — || January 25, 2009 || Kitt Peak || Spacewatch || NYS || align=right data-sort-value="0.72" | 720 m || 
|-id=150 bgcolor=#fefefe
| 296150 ||  || — || January 28, 2009 || Catalina || CSS || V || align=right | 1.1 km || 
|-id=151 bgcolor=#d6d6d6
| 296151 ||  || — || January 29, 2009 || Mount Lemmon || Mount Lemmon Survey || — || align=right | 3.6 km || 
|-id=152 bgcolor=#d6d6d6
| 296152 ||  || — || January 30, 2009 || Mount Lemmon || Mount Lemmon Survey || — || align=right | 3.9 km || 
|-id=153 bgcolor=#E9E9E9
| 296153 ||  || — || January 30, 2009 || Mount Lemmon || Mount Lemmon Survey || — || align=right | 2.7 km || 
|-id=154 bgcolor=#fefefe
| 296154 ||  || — || January 31, 2009 || Mount Lemmon || Mount Lemmon Survey || V || align=right data-sort-value="0.87" | 870 m || 
|-id=155 bgcolor=#d6d6d6
| 296155 ||  || — || January 24, 2009 || Cerro Burek || Alianza S4 Obs. || — || align=right | 3.1 km || 
|-id=156 bgcolor=#fefefe
| 296156 ||  || — || January 26, 2009 || Mount Lemmon || Mount Lemmon Survey || MAS || align=right data-sort-value="0.92" | 920 m || 
|-id=157 bgcolor=#fefefe
| 296157 ||  || — || January 26, 2009 || Purple Mountain || PMO NEO || MAS || align=right | 1.3 km || 
|-id=158 bgcolor=#fefefe
| 296158 ||  || — || January 28, 2009 || Catalina || CSS || NYS || align=right | 1.0 km || 
|-id=159 bgcolor=#d6d6d6
| 296159 ||  || — || January 31, 2009 || Kitt Peak || Spacewatch || — || align=right | 4.0 km || 
|-id=160 bgcolor=#d6d6d6
| 296160 ||  || — || January 31, 2009 || Kitt Peak || Spacewatch || — || align=right | 3.1 km || 
|-id=161 bgcolor=#E9E9E9
| 296161 ||  || — || January 31, 2009 || Kitt Peak || Spacewatch || — || align=right | 2.3 km || 
|-id=162 bgcolor=#d6d6d6
| 296162 ||  || — || January 29, 2009 || Kitt Peak || Spacewatch || KOR || align=right | 1.4 km || 
|-id=163 bgcolor=#d6d6d6
| 296163 ||  || — || January 29, 2009 || Kitt Peak || Spacewatch || — || align=right | 3.0 km || 
|-id=164 bgcolor=#fefefe
| 296164 ||  || — || January 29, 2009 || Kitt Peak || Spacewatch || NYS || align=right data-sort-value="0.79" | 790 m || 
|-id=165 bgcolor=#d6d6d6
| 296165 ||  || — || January 29, 2009 || Kitt Peak || Spacewatch || — || align=right | 3.8 km || 
|-id=166 bgcolor=#E9E9E9
| 296166 ||  || — || January 30, 2009 || Mount Lemmon || Mount Lemmon Survey || — || align=right | 2.4 km || 
|-id=167 bgcolor=#E9E9E9
| 296167 ||  || — || January 31, 2009 || Mount Lemmon || Mount Lemmon Survey || — || align=right | 2.5 km || 
|-id=168 bgcolor=#d6d6d6
| 296168 ||  || — || January 27, 2009 || Purple Mountain || PMO NEO || — || align=right | 3.9 km || 
|-id=169 bgcolor=#d6d6d6
| 296169 ||  || — || January 29, 2009 || Kitt Peak || Spacewatch || — || align=right | 5.4 km || 
|-id=170 bgcolor=#fefefe
| 296170 ||  || — || January 29, 2009 || Kitt Peak || Spacewatch || MAS || align=right data-sort-value="0.78" | 780 m || 
|-id=171 bgcolor=#E9E9E9
| 296171 ||  || — || January 29, 2009 || Kitt Peak || Spacewatch || — || align=right | 1.3 km || 
|-id=172 bgcolor=#E9E9E9
| 296172 ||  || — || January 29, 2009 || Kitt Peak || Spacewatch || — || align=right | 1.9 km || 
|-id=173 bgcolor=#E9E9E9
| 296173 ||  || — || January 29, 2009 || Kitt Peak || Spacewatch || — || align=right | 1.6 km || 
|-id=174 bgcolor=#d6d6d6
| 296174 ||  || — || January 29, 2009 || Kitt Peak || Spacewatch || — || align=right | 2.0 km || 
|-id=175 bgcolor=#E9E9E9
| 296175 ||  || — || January 30, 2009 || Kitt Peak || Spacewatch || — || align=right | 2.0 km || 
|-id=176 bgcolor=#fefefe
| 296176 ||  || — || January 30, 2009 || Kitt Peak || Spacewatch || — || align=right | 1.0 km || 
|-id=177 bgcolor=#d6d6d6
| 296177 ||  || — || January 31, 2009 || Mount Lemmon || Mount Lemmon Survey || — || align=right | 3.7 km || 
|-id=178 bgcolor=#d6d6d6
| 296178 ||  || — || January 31, 2009 || Kitt Peak || Spacewatch || HYG || align=right | 3.5 km || 
|-id=179 bgcolor=#fefefe
| 296179 ||  || — || January 29, 2009 || Mount Lemmon || Mount Lemmon Survey || NYS || align=right data-sort-value="0.79" | 790 m || 
|-id=180 bgcolor=#d6d6d6
| 296180 ||  || — || January 29, 2009 || Mount Lemmon || Mount Lemmon Survey || — || align=right | 3.7 km || 
|-id=181 bgcolor=#d6d6d6
| 296181 ||  || — || January 31, 2009 || Kitt Peak || Spacewatch || THM || align=right | 2.1 km || 
|-id=182 bgcolor=#E9E9E9
| 296182 ||  || — || January 31, 2009 || Kitt Peak || Spacewatch || — || align=right | 2.0 km || 
|-id=183 bgcolor=#fefefe
| 296183 ||  || — || January 31, 2009 || Kitt Peak || Spacewatch || NYS || align=right data-sort-value="0.84" | 840 m || 
|-id=184 bgcolor=#d6d6d6
| 296184 ||  || — || January 31, 2009 || Kitt Peak || Spacewatch || — || align=right | 4.1 km || 
|-id=185 bgcolor=#E9E9E9
| 296185 ||  || — || January 31, 2009 || Kitt Peak || Spacewatch || — || align=right | 2.2 km || 
|-id=186 bgcolor=#d6d6d6
| 296186 ||  || — || January 31, 2009 || Kitt Peak || Spacewatch || EOS || align=right | 2.7 km || 
|-id=187 bgcolor=#d6d6d6
| 296187 ||  || — || January 30, 2009 || Mount Lemmon || Mount Lemmon Survey || VER || align=right | 4.4 km || 
|-id=188 bgcolor=#fefefe
| 296188 ||  || — || January 31, 2009 || Kitt Peak || Spacewatch || NYS || align=right | 1.1 km || 
|-id=189 bgcolor=#E9E9E9
| 296189 ||  || — || January 16, 2009 || Kitt Peak || Spacewatch || — || align=right | 1.0 km || 
|-id=190 bgcolor=#E9E9E9
| 296190 ||  || — || January 16, 2009 || Kitt Peak || Spacewatch || HOF || align=right | 3.1 km || 
|-id=191 bgcolor=#d6d6d6
| 296191 ||  || — || January 17, 2009 || Mount Lemmon || Mount Lemmon Survey || THM || align=right | 2.8 km || 
|-id=192 bgcolor=#d6d6d6
| 296192 ||  || — || January 18, 2009 || Catalina || CSS || BRA || align=right | 2.2 km || 
|-id=193 bgcolor=#E9E9E9
| 296193 ||  || — || January 31, 2009 || Kitt Peak || Spacewatch || — || align=right data-sort-value="0.96" | 960 m || 
|-id=194 bgcolor=#d6d6d6
| 296194 ||  || — || January 25, 2009 || Kitt Peak || Spacewatch || KOR || align=right | 1.7 km || 
|-id=195 bgcolor=#E9E9E9
| 296195 ||  || — || January 25, 2009 || Catalina || CSS || — || align=right | 2.4 km || 
|-id=196 bgcolor=#d6d6d6
| 296196 ||  || — || January 25, 2009 || Kitt Peak || Spacewatch || EUP || align=right | 3.6 km || 
|-id=197 bgcolor=#d6d6d6
| 296197 ||  || — || January 18, 2009 || Kitt Peak || Spacewatch || — || align=right | 3.1 km || 
|-id=198 bgcolor=#d6d6d6
| 296198 ||  || — || January 25, 2009 || Kitt Peak || Spacewatch || — || align=right | 3.9 km || 
|-id=199 bgcolor=#d6d6d6
| 296199 ||  || — || January 26, 2009 || Purple Mountain || PMO NEO || — || align=right | 5.0 km || 
|-id=200 bgcolor=#d6d6d6
| 296200 ||  || — || January 30, 2009 || Mount Lemmon || Mount Lemmon Survey || — || align=right | 3.5 km || 
|}

296201–296300 

|-bgcolor=#d6d6d6
| 296201 ||  || — || January 31, 2009 || Mount Lemmon || Mount Lemmon Survey || — || align=right | 4.3 km || 
|-id=202 bgcolor=#d6d6d6
| 296202 ||  || — || January 31, 2009 || Kitt Peak || Spacewatch || — || align=right | 4.1 km || 
|-id=203 bgcolor=#d6d6d6
| 296203 ||  || — || January 18, 2009 || Catalina || CSS || EUP || align=right | 5.6 km || 
|-id=204 bgcolor=#E9E9E9
| 296204 ||  || — || January 20, 2009 || Mount Lemmon || Mount Lemmon Survey || ADE || align=right | 2.3 km || 
|-id=205 bgcolor=#fefefe
| 296205 ||  || — || February 1, 2009 || Bisei SG Center || BATTeRS || — || align=right | 1.0 km || 
|-id=206 bgcolor=#E9E9E9
| 296206 ||  || — || February 1, 2009 || Bisei SG Center || BATTeRS || — || align=right | 3.9 km || 
|-id=207 bgcolor=#fefefe
| 296207 ||  || — || February 2, 2009 || Moletai || K. Černis, J. Zdanavičius || — || align=right | 2.9 km || 
|-id=208 bgcolor=#d6d6d6
| 296208 ||  || — || February 13, 2009 || Calar Alto || F. Hormuth || — || align=right | 2.7 km || 
|-id=209 bgcolor=#E9E9E9
| 296209 ||  || — || February 1, 2009 || Mount Lemmon || Mount Lemmon Survey || — || align=right | 2.1 km || 
|-id=210 bgcolor=#fefefe
| 296210 ||  || — || February 2, 2009 || Catalina || CSS || — || align=right data-sort-value="0.76" | 760 m || 
|-id=211 bgcolor=#E9E9E9
| 296211 ||  || — || February 3, 2009 || Kitt Peak || Spacewatch || — || align=right | 2.4 km || 
|-id=212 bgcolor=#d6d6d6
| 296212 ||  || — || February 1, 2009 || Kitt Peak || Spacewatch || KOR || align=right | 1.5 km || 
|-id=213 bgcolor=#E9E9E9
| 296213 ||  || — || February 1, 2009 || Kitt Peak || Spacewatch || — || align=right | 3.3 km || 
|-id=214 bgcolor=#fefefe
| 296214 ||  || — || February 1, 2009 || Kitt Peak || Spacewatch || MAS || align=right data-sort-value="0.86" | 860 m || 
|-id=215 bgcolor=#E9E9E9
| 296215 ||  || — || February 1, 2009 || Kitt Peak || Spacewatch || WIT || align=right | 1.4 km || 
|-id=216 bgcolor=#d6d6d6
| 296216 ||  || — || February 1, 2009 || Kitt Peak || Spacewatch || — || align=right | 3.3 km || 
|-id=217 bgcolor=#E9E9E9
| 296217 ||  || — || February 1, 2009 || Kitt Peak || Spacewatch || HOF || align=right | 3.2 km || 
|-id=218 bgcolor=#d6d6d6
| 296218 ||  || — || February 1, 2009 || Kitt Peak || Spacewatch || — || align=right | 3.4 km || 
|-id=219 bgcolor=#E9E9E9
| 296219 ||  || — || February 1, 2009 || Kitt Peak || Spacewatch || — || align=right | 2.3 km || 
|-id=220 bgcolor=#E9E9E9
| 296220 ||  || — || February 1, 2009 || Kitt Peak || Spacewatch || — || align=right | 1.6 km || 
|-id=221 bgcolor=#fefefe
| 296221 ||  || — || February 1, 2009 || Kitt Peak || Spacewatch || — || align=right | 1.0 km || 
|-id=222 bgcolor=#d6d6d6
| 296222 ||  || — || February 1, 2009 || Kitt Peak || Spacewatch || KOR || align=right | 1.6 km || 
|-id=223 bgcolor=#E9E9E9
| 296223 ||  || — || February 2, 2009 || Kitt Peak || Spacewatch || — || align=right data-sort-value="0.90" | 900 m || 
|-id=224 bgcolor=#E9E9E9
| 296224 ||  || — || February 2, 2009 || Mount Lemmon || Mount Lemmon Survey || NEM || align=right | 2.9 km || 
|-id=225 bgcolor=#E9E9E9
| 296225 ||  || — || February 3, 2009 || Kitt Peak || Spacewatch || — || align=right | 3.6 km || 
|-id=226 bgcolor=#fefefe
| 296226 ||  || — || February 13, 2009 || Kitt Peak || Spacewatch || NYS || align=right data-sort-value="0.61" | 610 m || 
|-id=227 bgcolor=#E9E9E9
| 296227 ||  || — || February 13, 2009 || Kitt Peak || Spacewatch || — || align=right | 1.00 km || 
|-id=228 bgcolor=#fefefe
| 296228 ||  || — || February 13, 2009 || Kitt Peak || Spacewatch || — || align=right | 1.0 km || 
|-id=229 bgcolor=#d6d6d6
| 296229 ||  || — || February 14, 2009 || Kitt Peak || Spacewatch || — || align=right | 4.1 km || 
|-id=230 bgcolor=#d6d6d6
| 296230 ||  || — || February 14, 2009 || Kitt Peak || Spacewatch || — || align=right | 3.7 km || 
|-id=231 bgcolor=#fefefe
| 296231 ||  || — || February 14, 2009 || Kitt Peak || Spacewatch || — || align=right | 1.3 km || 
|-id=232 bgcolor=#E9E9E9
| 296232 ||  || — || February 14, 2009 || Kitt Peak || Spacewatch || — || align=right | 1.0 km || 
|-id=233 bgcolor=#d6d6d6
| 296233 ||  || — || February 14, 2009 || La Sagra || OAM Obs. || — || align=right | 4.1 km || 
|-id=234 bgcolor=#d6d6d6
| 296234 ||  || — || February 14, 2009 || La Sagra || OAM Obs. || EOS || align=right | 2.4 km || 
|-id=235 bgcolor=#E9E9E9
| 296235 ||  || — || February 14, 2009 || La Sagra || OAM Obs. || HNS || align=right | 1.3 km || 
|-id=236 bgcolor=#E9E9E9
| 296236 ||  || — || February 13, 2009 || Kitt Peak || Spacewatch || DOR || align=right | 3.0 km || 
|-id=237 bgcolor=#d6d6d6
| 296237 ||  || — || February 1, 2009 || Kitt Peak || Spacewatch || — || align=right | 4.0 km || 
|-id=238 bgcolor=#d6d6d6
| 296238 ||  || — || February 2, 2009 || Mount Lemmon || Mount Lemmon Survey || — || align=right | 4.0 km || 
|-id=239 bgcolor=#fefefe
| 296239 ||  || — || February 4, 2009 || Mount Lemmon || Mount Lemmon Survey || — || align=right data-sort-value="0.86" | 860 m || 
|-id=240 bgcolor=#E9E9E9
| 296240 ||  || — || February 14, 2009 || La Sagra || OAM Obs. || — || align=right | 3.8 km || 
|-id=241 bgcolor=#E9E9E9
| 296241 ||  || — || February 3, 2009 || Mount Lemmon || Mount Lemmon Survey || PAD || align=right | 1.9 km || 
|-id=242 bgcolor=#fefefe
| 296242 ||  || — || February 17, 2009 || Kitt Peak || Spacewatch || — || align=right data-sort-value="0.99" | 990 m || 
|-id=243 bgcolor=#fefefe
| 296243 ||  || — || February 18, 2009 || Socorro || LINEAR || — || align=right | 1.4 km || 
|-id=244 bgcolor=#fefefe
| 296244 ||  || — || February 22, 2009 || Catalina || CSS || H || align=right data-sort-value="0.77" | 770 m || 
|-id=245 bgcolor=#fefefe
| 296245 ||  || — || February 16, 2009 || Kitt Peak || Spacewatch || — || align=right | 1.3 km || 
|-id=246 bgcolor=#E9E9E9
| 296246 ||  || — || February 16, 2009 || Kitt Peak || Spacewatch || WIT || align=right | 1.1 km || 
|-id=247 bgcolor=#E9E9E9
| 296247 ||  || — || February 20, 2009 || Calvin-Rehoboth || Calvin–Rehoboth Obs. || — || align=right | 1.8 km || 
|-id=248 bgcolor=#E9E9E9
| 296248 ||  || — || February 17, 2009 || Kitt Peak || Spacewatch || — || align=right | 1.5 km || 
|-id=249 bgcolor=#d6d6d6
| 296249 ||  || — || February 19, 2009 || Mount Lemmon || Mount Lemmon Survey || — || align=right | 2.7 km || 
|-id=250 bgcolor=#E9E9E9
| 296250 ||  || — || February 16, 2009 || Catalina || CSS || HNS || align=right | 2.0 km || 
|-id=251 bgcolor=#d6d6d6
| 296251 ||  || — || February 19, 2009 || Kitt Peak || Spacewatch || — || align=right | 2.8 km || 
|-id=252 bgcolor=#d6d6d6
| 296252 ||  || — || February 19, 2009 || Kitt Peak || Spacewatch || — || align=right | 3.0 km || 
|-id=253 bgcolor=#fefefe
| 296253 ||  || — || February 19, 2009 || Kitt Peak || Spacewatch || — || align=right data-sort-value="0.71" | 710 m || 
|-id=254 bgcolor=#E9E9E9
| 296254 ||  || — || February 20, 2009 || Kitt Peak || Spacewatch || EUN || align=right | 1.3 km || 
|-id=255 bgcolor=#d6d6d6
| 296255 ||  || — || February 20, 2009 || Mount Lemmon || Mount Lemmon Survey || — || align=right | 2.3 km || 
|-id=256 bgcolor=#d6d6d6
| 296256 ||  || — || February 22, 2009 || Calar Alto || F. Hormuth || EOS || align=right | 2.4 km || 
|-id=257 bgcolor=#E9E9E9
| 296257 ||  || — || February 20, 2009 || Kitt Peak || Spacewatch || — || align=right | 3.3 km || 
|-id=258 bgcolor=#d6d6d6
| 296258 ||  || — || February 20, 2009 || Kitt Peak || Spacewatch || — || align=right | 3.2 km || 
|-id=259 bgcolor=#d6d6d6
| 296259 ||  || — || February 20, 2009 || Kitt Peak || Spacewatch || — || align=right | 3.7 km || 
|-id=260 bgcolor=#d6d6d6
| 296260 ||  || — || February 20, 2009 || Kitt Peak || Spacewatch || HYG || align=right | 3.3 km || 
|-id=261 bgcolor=#d6d6d6
| 296261 ||  || — || February 20, 2009 || Kitt Peak || Spacewatch || — || align=right | 3.0 km || 
|-id=262 bgcolor=#d6d6d6
| 296262 ||  || — || February 20, 2009 || Kitt Peak || Spacewatch || BRA || align=right | 2.6 km || 
|-id=263 bgcolor=#d6d6d6
| 296263 ||  || — || February 20, 2009 || Kitt Peak || Spacewatch || — || align=right | 2.2 km || 
|-id=264 bgcolor=#E9E9E9
| 296264 ||  || — || February 22, 2009 || Mount Lemmon || Mount Lemmon Survey || — || align=right | 2.1 km || 
|-id=265 bgcolor=#E9E9E9
| 296265 ||  || — || February 19, 2009 || Catalina || CSS || — || align=right | 3.3 km || 
|-id=266 bgcolor=#fefefe
| 296266 ||  || — || February 19, 2009 || Dauban || F. Kugel || — || align=right | 1.2 km || 
|-id=267 bgcolor=#E9E9E9
| 296267 ||  || — || February 16, 2009 || La Sagra || OAM Obs. || — || align=right | 2.0 km || 
|-id=268 bgcolor=#E9E9E9
| 296268 ||  || — || February 17, 2009 || La Sagra || OAM Obs. || HOF || align=right | 3.2 km || 
|-id=269 bgcolor=#d6d6d6
| 296269 ||  || — || February 19, 2009 || La Sagra || OAM Obs. || — || align=right | 4.0 km || 
|-id=270 bgcolor=#fefefe
| 296270 ||  || — || February 19, 2009 || Kitt Peak || Spacewatch || — || align=right data-sort-value="0.89" | 890 m || 
|-id=271 bgcolor=#fefefe
| 296271 ||  || — || February 26, 2009 || Socorro || LINEAR || V || align=right data-sort-value="0.80" | 800 m || 
|-id=272 bgcolor=#E9E9E9
| 296272 ||  || — || February 23, 2009 || Socorro || LINEAR || — || align=right | 1.3 km || 
|-id=273 bgcolor=#d6d6d6
| 296273 ||  || — || February 23, 2009 || Socorro || LINEAR || — || align=right | 4.0 km || 
|-id=274 bgcolor=#d6d6d6
| 296274 ||  || — || February 28, 2009 || Wildberg || R. Apitzsch || VER || align=right | 3.8 km || 
|-id=275 bgcolor=#E9E9E9
| 296275 ||  || — || February 26, 2009 || Socorro || LINEAR || — || align=right | 1.4 km || 
|-id=276 bgcolor=#E9E9E9
| 296276 ||  || — || February 21, 2009 || Kitt Peak || Spacewatch || — || align=right | 1.1 km || 
|-id=277 bgcolor=#E9E9E9
| 296277 ||  || — || February 22, 2009 || Kitt Peak || Spacewatch || — || align=right | 2.2 km || 
|-id=278 bgcolor=#fefefe
| 296278 ||  || — || February 22, 2009 || Kitt Peak || Spacewatch || — || align=right data-sort-value="0.84" | 840 m || 
|-id=279 bgcolor=#d6d6d6
| 296279 ||  || — || February 22, 2009 || Kitt Peak || Spacewatch || KAR || align=right | 1.5 km || 
|-id=280 bgcolor=#E9E9E9
| 296280 ||  || — || February 22, 2009 || Kitt Peak || Spacewatch || — || align=right | 2.1 km || 
|-id=281 bgcolor=#E9E9E9
| 296281 ||  || — || February 22, 2009 || Kitt Peak || Spacewatch || — || align=right | 2.0 km || 
|-id=282 bgcolor=#d6d6d6
| 296282 ||  || — || February 22, 2009 || Mount Lemmon || Mount Lemmon Survey || URS || align=right | 5.6 km || 
|-id=283 bgcolor=#fefefe
| 296283 ||  || — || February 26, 2009 || Catalina || CSS || — || align=right data-sort-value="0.87" | 870 m || 
|-id=284 bgcolor=#d6d6d6
| 296284 ||  || — || February 17, 2009 || Kitt Peak || Spacewatch || — || align=right | 5.6 km || 
|-id=285 bgcolor=#d6d6d6
| 296285 ||  || — || February 25, 2009 || Črni Vrh || Črni Vrh || — || align=right | 4.2 km || 
|-id=286 bgcolor=#d6d6d6
| 296286 ||  || — || September 12, 2006 || Catalina || CSS || — || align=right | 3.1 km || 
|-id=287 bgcolor=#fefefe
| 296287 ||  || — || February 26, 2009 || Kitt Peak || Spacewatch || — || align=right data-sort-value="0.91" | 910 m || 
|-id=288 bgcolor=#E9E9E9
| 296288 ||  || — || February 19, 2009 || Kitt Peak || Spacewatch || — || align=right | 1.1 km || 
|-id=289 bgcolor=#d6d6d6
| 296289 ||  || — || February 24, 2009 || La Sagra || OAM Obs. || — || align=right | 3.9 km || 
|-id=290 bgcolor=#fefefe
| 296290 ||  || — || February 24, 2009 || Kitt Peak || Spacewatch || — || align=right data-sort-value="0.60" | 600 m || 
|-id=291 bgcolor=#d6d6d6
| 296291 ||  || — || February 24, 2009 || Kitt Peak || Spacewatch || — || align=right | 2.6 km || 
|-id=292 bgcolor=#E9E9E9
| 296292 ||  || — || February 27, 2009 || Kitt Peak || Spacewatch || — || align=right data-sort-value="0.88" | 880 m || 
|-id=293 bgcolor=#d6d6d6
| 296293 ||  || — || February 24, 2009 || Kitt Peak || Spacewatch || — || align=right | 3.4 km || 
|-id=294 bgcolor=#E9E9E9
| 296294 ||  || — || February 24, 2009 || Mount Lemmon || Mount Lemmon Survey || EUN || align=right | 1.6 km || 
|-id=295 bgcolor=#fefefe
| 296295 ||  || — || February 26, 2009 || Catalina || CSS || — || align=right data-sort-value="0.54" | 540 m || 
|-id=296 bgcolor=#E9E9E9
| 296296 ||  || — || February 26, 2009 || Kitt Peak || Spacewatch || — || align=right | 1.4 km || 
|-id=297 bgcolor=#d6d6d6
| 296297 ||  || — || February 28, 2009 || Kitt Peak || Spacewatch || FIR || align=right | 4.1 km || 
|-id=298 bgcolor=#E9E9E9
| 296298 ||  || — || February 23, 2009 || La Sagra || OAM Obs. || — || align=right | 2.3 km || 
|-id=299 bgcolor=#d6d6d6
| 296299 ||  || — || February 27, 2009 || Kitt Peak || Spacewatch || — || align=right | 5.0 km || 
|-id=300 bgcolor=#d6d6d6
| 296300 ||  || — || February 27, 2009 || Kitt Peak || Spacewatch || HYG || align=right | 3.1 km || 
|}

296301–296400 

|-bgcolor=#E9E9E9
| 296301 ||  || — || February 27, 2009 || Kitt Peak || Spacewatch || — || align=right | 1.5 km || 
|-id=302 bgcolor=#E9E9E9
| 296302 ||  || — || February 24, 2009 || Catalina || CSS || — || align=right | 2.4 km || 
|-id=303 bgcolor=#fefefe
| 296303 ||  || — || February 19, 2009 || Kitt Peak || Spacewatch || MAS || align=right data-sort-value="0.77" | 770 m || 
|-id=304 bgcolor=#E9E9E9
| 296304 ||  || — || February 19, 2009 || Kitt Peak || Spacewatch || — || align=right | 3.3 km || 
|-id=305 bgcolor=#d6d6d6
| 296305 ||  || — || February 20, 2009 || Kitt Peak || Spacewatch || KOR || align=right | 1.7 km || 
|-id=306 bgcolor=#d6d6d6
| 296306 ||  || — || February 20, 2009 || Kitt Peak || Spacewatch || — || align=right | 3.7 km || 
|-id=307 bgcolor=#d6d6d6
| 296307 ||  || — || February 20, 2009 || Kitt Peak || Spacewatch || — || align=right | 2.8 km || 
|-id=308 bgcolor=#E9E9E9
| 296308 ||  || — || February 24, 2009 || Catalina || CSS || — || align=right | 3.1 km || 
|-id=309 bgcolor=#fefefe
| 296309 ||  || — || February 24, 2009 || Kitt Peak || Spacewatch || — || align=right data-sort-value="0.63" | 630 m || 
|-id=310 bgcolor=#fefefe
| 296310 ||  || — || February 20, 2009 || Mount Lemmon || Mount Lemmon Survey || — || align=right | 1.1 km || 
|-id=311 bgcolor=#d6d6d6
| 296311 ||  || — || February 19, 2009 || Kitt Peak || Spacewatch || VER || align=right | 3.0 km || 
|-id=312 bgcolor=#E9E9E9
| 296312 ||  || — || February 28, 2009 || Kitt Peak || Spacewatch || — || align=right | 2.9 km || 
|-id=313 bgcolor=#fefefe
| 296313 ||  || — || February 28, 2009 || Kitt Peak || Spacewatch || FLO || align=right data-sort-value="0.66" | 660 m || 
|-id=314 bgcolor=#E9E9E9
| 296314 ||  || — || February 19, 2009 || Kitt Peak || Spacewatch || — || align=right | 1.8 km || 
|-id=315 bgcolor=#fefefe
| 296315 ||  || — || February 24, 2009 || Kitt Peak || Spacewatch || — || align=right data-sort-value="0.94" | 940 m || 
|-id=316 bgcolor=#fefefe
| 296316 ||  || — || February 19, 2009 || Kitt Peak || Spacewatch || KLI || align=right | 1.6 km || 
|-id=317 bgcolor=#d6d6d6
| 296317 ||  || — || February 21, 2009 || Kitt Peak || Spacewatch || — || align=right | 3.6 km || 
|-id=318 bgcolor=#FFC2E0
| 296318 ||  || — || March 3, 2009 || Catalina || CSS || APO || align=right data-sort-value="0.71" | 710 m || 
|-id=319 bgcolor=#d6d6d6
| 296319 ||  || — || March 5, 2009 || Great Shefford || P. Birtwhistle || — || align=right | 2.7 km || 
|-id=320 bgcolor=#E9E9E9
| 296320 ||  || — || March 2, 2009 || Mount Lemmon || Mount Lemmon Survey || — || align=right | 2.2 km || 
|-id=321 bgcolor=#E9E9E9
| 296321 ||  || — || January 11, 2008 || Kitt Peak || Spacewatch || — || align=right | 3.1 km || 
|-id=322 bgcolor=#d6d6d6
| 296322 ||  || — || March 15, 2009 || Kitt Peak || Spacewatch || KOR || align=right | 1.9 km || 
|-id=323 bgcolor=#E9E9E9
| 296323 ||  || — || March 15, 2009 || Kitt Peak || Spacewatch || — || align=right | 2.9 km || 
|-id=324 bgcolor=#E9E9E9
| 296324 ||  || — || March 15, 2009 || Kitt Peak || Spacewatch || — || align=right | 2.2 km || 
|-id=325 bgcolor=#fefefe
| 296325 ||  || — || March 15, 2009 || Kitt Peak || Spacewatch || — || align=right data-sort-value="0.97" | 970 m || 
|-id=326 bgcolor=#E9E9E9
| 296326 ||  || — || March 15, 2009 || Kitt Peak || Spacewatch || — || align=right | 2.2 km || 
|-id=327 bgcolor=#E9E9E9
| 296327 ||  || — || March 15, 2009 || Catalina || CSS || — || align=right | 3.0 km || 
|-id=328 bgcolor=#E9E9E9
| 296328 ||  || — || March 15, 2009 || Mount Lemmon || Mount Lemmon Survey || — || align=right | 2.1 km || 
|-id=329 bgcolor=#E9E9E9
| 296329 ||  || — || March 15, 2009 || Mount Lemmon || Mount Lemmon Survey || — || align=right | 1.2 km || 
|-id=330 bgcolor=#d6d6d6
| 296330 ||  || — || March 15, 2009 || La Sagra || OAM Obs. || EOS || align=right | 3.0 km || 
|-id=331 bgcolor=#fefefe
| 296331 ||  || — || March 15, 2009 || Kitt Peak || Spacewatch || FLO || align=right data-sort-value="0.57" | 570 m || 
|-id=332 bgcolor=#fefefe
| 296332 ||  || — || March 2, 2009 || Mount Lemmon || Mount Lemmon Survey || — || align=right data-sort-value="0.85" | 850 m || 
|-id=333 bgcolor=#d6d6d6
| 296333 ||  || — || March 3, 2009 || Mount Lemmon || Mount Lemmon Survey || — || align=right | 2.3 km || 
|-id=334 bgcolor=#E9E9E9
| 296334 ||  || — || March 2, 2009 || Mount Lemmon || Mount Lemmon Survey || PAD || align=right | 2.0 km || 
|-id=335 bgcolor=#d6d6d6
| 296335 ||  || — || March 3, 2009 || Mount Lemmon || Mount Lemmon Survey || KAR || align=right | 1.5 km || 
|-id=336 bgcolor=#d6d6d6
| 296336 ||  || — || March 8, 2009 || Mount Lemmon || Mount Lemmon Survey || URS || align=right | 5.1 km || 
|-id=337 bgcolor=#d6d6d6
| 296337 ||  || — || March 3, 2009 || Catalina || CSS || — || align=right | 4.3 km || 
|-id=338 bgcolor=#fefefe
| 296338 ||  || — || March 2, 2009 || Mount Lemmon || Mount Lemmon Survey || NYS || align=right data-sort-value="0.87" | 870 m || 
|-id=339 bgcolor=#fefefe
| 296339 ||  || — || March 2, 2009 || Kitt Peak || Spacewatch || — || align=right data-sort-value="0.79" | 790 m || 
|-id=340 bgcolor=#fefefe
| 296340 ||  || — || March 17, 2009 || Catalina || CSS || H || align=right data-sort-value="0.70" | 700 m || 
|-id=341 bgcolor=#d6d6d6
| 296341 ||  || — || March 16, 2009 || Purple Mountain || PMO NEO || — || align=right | 3.8 km || 
|-id=342 bgcolor=#d6d6d6
| 296342 ||  || — || March 18, 2009 || Dauban || F. Kugel || HYG || align=right | 3.3 km || 
|-id=343 bgcolor=#d6d6d6
| 296343 ||  || — || March 18, 2009 || La Sagra || OAM Obs. || — || align=right | 5.4 km || 
|-id=344 bgcolor=#fefefe
| 296344 ||  || — || March 18, 2009 || La Sagra || OAM Obs. || NYS || align=right data-sort-value="0.84" | 840 m || 
|-id=345 bgcolor=#fefefe
| 296345 ||  || — || March 19, 2009 || Tzec Maun || L. Elenin || — || align=right | 1.1 km || 
|-id=346 bgcolor=#E9E9E9
| 296346 ||  || — || March 16, 2009 || Kitt Peak || Spacewatch || — || align=right | 2.0 km || 
|-id=347 bgcolor=#d6d6d6
| 296347 ||  || — || March 16, 2009 || Mount Lemmon || Mount Lemmon Survey || — || align=right | 2.8 km || 
|-id=348 bgcolor=#fefefe
| 296348 ||  || — || March 16, 2009 || Mount Lemmon || Mount Lemmon Survey || FLO || align=right data-sort-value="0.64" | 640 m || 
|-id=349 bgcolor=#fefefe
| 296349 ||  || — || March 16, 2009 || Purple Mountain || PMO NEO || — || align=right | 1.3 km || 
|-id=350 bgcolor=#fefefe
| 296350 ||  || — || March 17, 2009 || Kitt Peak || Spacewatch || — || align=right | 1.1 km || 
|-id=351 bgcolor=#E9E9E9
| 296351 Linyongbin ||  ||  || March 20, 2009 || Lulin Observatory || LUSS || — || align=right | 2.1 km || 
|-id=352 bgcolor=#d6d6d6
| 296352 ||  || — || March 18, 2009 || Kitt Peak || Spacewatch || — || align=right | 4.6 km || 
|-id=353 bgcolor=#fefefe
| 296353 ||  || — || March 18, 2009 || Kitt Peak || Spacewatch || V || align=right data-sort-value="0.77" | 770 m || 
|-id=354 bgcolor=#E9E9E9
| 296354 ||  || — || March 18, 2009 || Kitt Peak || Spacewatch || ADE || align=right | 3.6 km || 
|-id=355 bgcolor=#fefefe
| 296355 ||  || — || March 19, 2009 || Kitt Peak || Spacewatch || — || align=right data-sort-value="0.76" | 760 m || 
|-id=356 bgcolor=#d6d6d6
| 296356 ||  || — || March 20, 2009 || Bergisch Gladbac || W. Bickel || — || align=right | 1.8 km || 
|-id=357 bgcolor=#fefefe
| 296357 ||  || — || March 21, 2009 || Mount Lemmon || Mount Lemmon Survey || — || align=right data-sort-value="0.89" | 890 m || 
|-id=358 bgcolor=#fefefe
| 296358 ||  || — || March 22, 2009 || La Sagra || OAM Obs. || V || align=right | 1.0 km || 
|-id=359 bgcolor=#E9E9E9
| 296359 ||  || — || March 21, 2009 || Catalina || CSS || — || align=right | 2.9 km || 
|-id=360 bgcolor=#fefefe
| 296360 ||  || — || March 20, 2009 || La Sagra || OAM Obs. || NYS || align=right data-sort-value="0.73" | 730 m || 
|-id=361 bgcolor=#d6d6d6
| 296361 ||  || — || March 22, 2009 || Hibiscus || N. Teamo || — || align=right | 3.9 km || 
|-id=362 bgcolor=#d6d6d6
| 296362 ||  || — || March 21, 2009 || Taunus || E. Schwab, R. Kling || — || align=right | 3.9 km || 
|-id=363 bgcolor=#d6d6d6
| 296363 ||  || — || March 17, 2009 || Kitt Peak || Spacewatch || KAR || align=right | 1.8 km || 
|-id=364 bgcolor=#fefefe
| 296364 ||  || — || March 19, 2009 || Mount Lemmon || Mount Lemmon Survey || — || align=right | 1.1 km || 
|-id=365 bgcolor=#fefefe
| 296365 ||  || — || March 25, 2009 || Kanab || E. E. Sheridan || — || align=right data-sort-value="0.94" | 940 m || 
|-id=366 bgcolor=#d6d6d6
| 296366 ||  || — || March 23, 2009 || Hibiscus || N. Teamo || — || align=right | 3.3 km || 
|-id=367 bgcolor=#E9E9E9
| 296367 ||  || — || March 24, 2009 || La Sagra || OAM Obs. || BRU || align=right | 3.3 km || 
|-id=368 bgcolor=#fefefe
| 296368 ||  || — || March 24, 2009 || Mount Lemmon || Mount Lemmon Survey || — || align=right data-sort-value="0.90" | 900 m || 
|-id=369 bgcolor=#fefefe
| 296369 ||  || — || October 6, 1999 || Kitt Peak || Spacewatch || — || align=right | 1.1 km || 
|-id=370 bgcolor=#fefefe
| 296370 ||  || — || March 27, 2009 || Catalina || CSS || V || align=right data-sort-value="0.86" | 860 m || 
|-id=371 bgcolor=#E9E9E9
| 296371 ||  || — || March 28, 2009 || Kitt Peak || Spacewatch || — || align=right | 3.1 km || 
|-id=372 bgcolor=#E9E9E9
| 296372 ||  || — || March 28, 2009 || Kitt Peak || Spacewatch || — || align=right | 1.6 km || 
|-id=373 bgcolor=#d6d6d6
| 296373 ||  || — || March 30, 2009 || Sierra Stars || F. Tozzi || 7:4* || align=right | 6.5 km || 
|-id=374 bgcolor=#d6d6d6
| 296374 ||  || — || March 29, 2009 || Bergisch Gladbac || W. Bickel || — || align=right | 3.4 km || 
|-id=375 bgcolor=#d6d6d6
| 296375 ||  || — || March 22, 2009 || Mount Lemmon || Mount Lemmon Survey || EOS || align=right | 2.6 km || 
|-id=376 bgcolor=#fefefe
| 296376 ||  || — || March 24, 2009 || Kitt Peak || Spacewatch || — || align=right data-sort-value="0.96" | 960 m || 
|-id=377 bgcolor=#fefefe
| 296377 ||  || — || March 28, 2009 || Kitt Peak || Spacewatch || H || align=right data-sort-value="0.73" | 730 m || 
|-id=378 bgcolor=#fefefe
| 296378 ||  || — || March 27, 2009 || Kitt Peak || Spacewatch || MAS || align=right data-sort-value="0.76" | 760 m || 
|-id=379 bgcolor=#fefefe
| 296379 ||  || — || March 26, 2009 || Mount Lemmon || Mount Lemmon Survey || — || align=right | 1.1 km || 
|-id=380 bgcolor=#fefefe
| 296380 ||  || — || March 29, 2009 || Kitt Peak || Spacewatch || ERI || align=right | 2.8 km || 
|-id=381 bgcolor=#fefefe
| 296381 ||  || — || March 29, 2009 || Kitt Peak || Spacewatch || — || align=right data-sort-value="0.66" | 660 m || 
|-id=382 bgcolor=#d6d6d6
| 296382 ||  || — || March 19, 2009 || Catalina || CSS || — || align=right | 4.7 km || 
|-id=383 bgcolor=#d6d6d6
| 296383 ||  || — || March 29, 2009 || Catalina || CSS || Tj (2.99) || align=right | 6.3 km || 
|-id=384 bgcolor=#E9E9E9
| 296384 ||  || — || March 17, 2009 || Kitt Peak || Spacewatch || — || align=right | 1.8 km || 
|-id=385 bgcolor=#E9E9E9
| 296385 ||  || — || March 17, 2009 || Kitt Peak || Spacewatch || HEN || align=right | 1.4 km || 
|-id=386 bgcolor=#d6d6d6
| 296386 ||  || — || March 31, 2009 || Mount Lemmon || Mount Lemmon Survey || SYL7:4 || align=right | 5.2 km || 
|-id=387 bgcolor=#fefefe
| 296387 ||  || — || March 16, 2009 || Kitt Peak || Spacewatch || — || align=right data-sort-value="0.89" | 890 m || 
|-id=388 bgcolor=#fefefe
| 296388 ||  || — || March 18, 2009 || Kitt Peak || Spacewatch || MAS || align=right data-sort-value="0.90" | 900 m || 
|-id=389 bgcolor=#E9E9E9
| 296389 ||  || — || March 28, 2009 || Kitt Peak || Spacewatch || — || align=right | 2.9 km || 
|-id=390 bgcolor=#fefefe
| 296390 ||  || — || March 17, 2009 || Kitt Peak || Spacewatch || MAS || align=right | 1.0 km || 
|-id=391 bgcolor=#fefefe
| 296391 ||  || — || March 19, 2009 || Kitt Peak || Spacewatch || V || align=right data-sort-value="0.85" | 850 m || 
|-id=392 bgcolor=#E9E9E9
| 296392 ||  || — || March 19, 2009 || Mount Lemmon || Mount Lemmon Survey || — || align=right | 2.7 km || 
|-id=393 bgcolor=#d6d6d6
| 296393 ||  || — || March 21, 2009 || Kitt Peak || Spacewatch || — || align=right | 4.1 km || 
|-id=394 bgcolor=#fefefe
| 296394 ||  || — || March 29, 2009 || Kitt Peak || Spacewatch || — || align=right | 1.2 km || 
|-id=395 bgcolor=#fefefe
| 296395 ||  || — || March 29, 2009 || Kitt Peak || Spacewatch || — || align=right | 1.1 km || 
|-id=396 bgcolor=#fefefe
| 296396 ||  || — || March 16, 2009 || Kitt Peak || Spacewatch || — || align=right | 2.3 km || 
|-id=397 bgcolor=#E9E9E9
| 296397 ||  || — || March 18, 2009 || Mount Lemmon || Mount Lemmon Survey || — || align=right | 1.3 km || 
|-id=398 bgcolor=#fefefe
| 296398 ||  || — || March 19, 2009 || Kitt Peak || Spacewatch || — || align=right | 1.2 km || 
|-id=399 bgcolor=#E9E9E9
| 296399 ||  || — || March 31, 2009 || Mount Lemmon || Mount Lemmon Survey || — || align=right | 3.4 km || 
|-id=400 bgcolor=#E9E9E9
| 296400 ||  || — || March 17, 2009 || Siding Spring || SSS || — || align=right | 1.5 km || 
|}

296401–296500 

|-bgcolor=#d6d6d6
| 296401 ||  || — || March 17, 2009 || Kitt Peak || Spacewatch || — || align=right | 4.7 km || 
|-id=402 bgcolor=#fefefe
| 296402 ||  || — || April 3, 2009 || Cerro Burek || Alianza S4 Obs. || — || align=right data-sort-value="0.96" | 960 m || 
|-id=403 bgcolor=#E9E9E9
| 296403 ||  || — || April 5, 2009 || Cerro Burek || Alianza S4 Obs. || — || align=right | 1.5 km || 
|-id=404 bgcolor=#fefefe
| 296404 ||  || — || April 12, 2009 || Altschwendt || W. Ries || FLO || align=right data-sort-value="0.72" | 720 m || 
|-id=405 bgcolor=#fefefe
| 296405 ||  || — || April 5, 2009 || La Sagra || OAM Obs. || NYS || align=right data-sort-value="0.88" | 880 m || 
|-id=406 bgcolor=#fefefe
| 296406 ||  || — || April 15, 2009 || Socorro || LINEAR || — || align=right | 1.2 km || 
|-id=407 bgcolor=#E9E9E9
| 296407 ||  || — || April 5, 2009 || Cerro Burek || Alianza S4 Obs. || MAR || align=right | 1.2 km || 
|-id=408 bgcolor=#fefefe
| 296408 ||  || — || April 15, 2009 || Siding Spring || SSS || H || align=right data-sort-value="0.70" | 700 m || 
|-id=409 bgcolor=#d6d6d6
| 296409 ||  || — || April 2, 2009 || Kitt Peak || Spacewatch || KOR || align=right | 1.4 km || 
|-id=410 bgcolor=#E9E9E9
| 296410 ||  || — || April 2, 2009 || Siding Spring || SSS || — || align=right | 4.5 km || 
|-id=411 bgcolor=#fefefe
| 296411 ||  || — || April 2, 2009 || Mount Lemmon || Mount Lemmon Survey || — || align=right data-sort-value="0.96" | 960 m || 
|-id=412 bgcolor=#fefefe
| 296412 ||  || — || April 16, 2009 || Catalina || CSS || — || align=right | 1.3 km || 
|-id=413 bgcolor=#d6d6d6
| 296413 ||  || — || April 17, 2009 || Kitt Peak || Spacewatch || — || align=right | 4.6 km || 
|-id=414 bgcolor=#fefefe
| 296414 ||  || — || April 17, 2009 || Catalina || CSS || — || align=right data-sort-value="0.81" | 810 m || 
|-id=415 bgcolor=#d6d6d6
| 296415 ||  || — || April 16, 2009 || Catalina || CSS || BRA || align=right | 2.7 km || 
|-id=416 bgcolor=#d6d6d6
| 296416 ||  || — || April 16, 2009 || Kitt Peak || Spacewatch || EOS || align=right | 4.4 km || 
|-id=417 bgcolor=#d6d6d6
| 296417 ||  || — || April 17, 2009 || Kitt Peak || Spacewatch || TIR || align=right | 2.1 km || 
|-id=418 bgcolor=#E9E9E9
| 296418 ||  || — || April 17, 2009 || Kitt Peak || Spacewatch || PAD || align=right | 2.7 km || 
|-id=419 bgcolor=#fefefe
| 296419 ||  || — || April 17, 2009 || Kitt Peak || Spacewatch || — || align=right | 1.0 km || 
|-id=420 bgcolor=#fefefe
| 296420 ||  || — || April 18, 2009 || Kitt Peak || Spacewatch || V || align=right data-sort-value="0.72" | 720 m || 
|-id=421 bgcolor=#fefefe
| 296421 ||  || — || April 19, 2009 || Kitt Peak || Spacewatch || — || align=right data-sort-value="0.95" | 950 m || 
|-id=422 bgcolor=#E9E9E9
| 296422 ||  || — || April 19, 2009 || Mount Lemmon || Mount Lemmon Survey || — || align=right | 1.1 km || 
|-id=423 bgcolor=#fefefe
| 296423 ||  || — || April 17, 2009 || Kitt Peak || Spacewatch || V || align=right data-sort-value="0.78" | 780 m || 
|-id=424 bgcolor=#fefefe
| 296424 ||  || — || April 19, 2009 || Kitt Peak || Spacewatch || — || align=right data-sort-value="0.88" | 880 m || 
|-id=425 bgcolor=#E9E9E9
| 296425 ||  || — || April 20, 2009 || Socorro || LINEAR || — || align=right | 3.4 km || 
|-id=426 bgcolor=#fefefe
| 296426 ||  || — || April 20, 2009 || La Sagra || OAM Obs. || MAS || align=right | 1.1 km || 
|-id=427 bgcolor=#fefefe
| 296427 ||  || — || April 17, 2009 || Catalina || CSS || V || align=right data-sort-value="0.95" | 950 m || 
|-id=428 bgcolor=#E9E9E9
| 296428 ||  || — || April 18, 2009 || Mount Lemmon || Mount Lemmon Survey || — || align=right | 1.6 km || 
|-id=429 bgcolor=#fefefe
| 296429 ||  || — || April 20, 2009 || Kitt Peak || Spacewatch || NYS || align=right data-sort-value="0.80" | 800 m || 
|-id=430 bgcolor=#E9E9E9
| 296430 ||  || — || April 20, 2009 || Kitt Peak || Spacewatch || NEM || align=right | 2.5 km || 
|-id=431 bgcolor=#E9E9E9
| 296431 ||  || — || April 20, 2009 || Kitt Peak || Spacewatch || — || align=right | 1.7 km || 
|-id=432 bgcolor=#fefefe
| 296432 ||  || — || April 20, 2009 || Kitt Peak || Spacewatch || — || align=right data-sort-value="0.84" | 840 m || 
|-id=433 bgcolor=#fefefe
| 296433 ||  || — || April 21, 2009 || La Sagra || OAM Obs. || — || align=right data-sort-value="0.76" | 760 m || 
|-id=434 bgcolor=#d6d6d6
| 296434 ||  || — || April 18, 2009 || Kitt Peak || Spacewatch || KOR || align=right | 1.9 km || 
|-id=435 bgcolor=#d6d6d6
| 296435 ||  || — || April 19, 2009 || Kitt Peak || Spacewatch || — || align=right | 3.6 km || 
|-id=436 bgcolor=#d6d6d6
| 296436 ||  || — || April 19, 2009 || Kitt Peak || Spacewatch || — || align=right | 4.3 km || 
|-id=437 bgcolor=#fefefe
| 296437 ||  || — || April 19, 2009 || Kitt Peak || Spacewatch || FLO || align=right data-sort-value="0.71" | 710 m || 
|-id=438 bgcolor=#E9E9E9
| 296438 ||  || — || April 19, 2009 || Kitt Peak || Spacewatch || — || align=right | 2.4 km || 
|-id=439 bgcolor=#d6d6d6
| 296439 ||  || — || April 19, 2009 || Kitt Peak || Spacewatch || URS || align=right | 3.4 km || 
|-id=440 bgcolor=#d6d6d6
| 296440 ||  || — || April 21, 2009 || Kitt Peak || Spacewatch || — || align=right | 2.8 km || 
|-id=441 bgcolor=#E9E9E9
| 296441 ||  || — || April 21, 2009 || Kitt Peak || Spacewatch || — || align=right | 1.2 km || 
|-id=442 bgcolor=#E9E9E9
| 296442 ||  || — || April 20, 2009 || Kitt Peak || Spacewatch || — || align=right | 3.2 km || 
|-id=443 bgcolor=#fefefe
| 296443 ||  || — || April 20, 2009 || Kitt Peak || Spacewatch || — || align=right data-sort-value="0.85" | 850 m || 
|-id=444 bgcolor=#d6d6d6
| 296444 ||  || — || April 20, 2009 || Kitt Peak || Spacewatch || — || align=right | 2.8 km || 
|-id=445 bgcolor=#fefefe
| 296445 ||  || — || April 20, 2009 || La Sagra || OAM Obs. || — || align=right | 1.2 km || 
|-id=446 bgcolor=#fefefe
| 296446 ||  || — || April 24, 2009 || Gaisberg || R. Gierlinger || — || align=right | 1.1 km || 
|-id=447 bgcolor=#E9E9E9
| 296447 ||  || — || April 21, 2009 || La Sagra || OAM Obs. || — || align=right | 3.5 km || 
|-id=448 bgcolor=#d6d6d6
| 296448 ||  || — || April 21, 2009 || Bergisch Gladbac || W. Bickel || MEL || align=right | 5.7 km || 
|-id=449 bgcolor=#E9E9E9
| 296449 ||  || — || April 23, 2009 || La Sagra || OAM Obs. || — || align=right | 3.2 km || 
|-id=450 bgcolor=#fefefe
| 296450 ||  || — || April 22, 2009 || Kitt Peak || Spacewatch || — || align=right data-sort-value="0.81" | 810 m || 
|-id=451 bgcolor=#E9E9E9
| 296451 ||  || — || April 23, 2009 || Kitt Peak || Spacewatch || PAD || align=right | 3.6 km || 
|-id=452 bgcolor=#fefefe
| 296452 ||  || — || April 23, 2009 || Kitt Peak || Spacewatch || — || align=right data-sort-value="0.86" | 860 m || 
|-id=453 bgcolor=#fefefe
| 296453 ||  || — || April 23, 2009 || Kitt Peak || Spacewatch || — || align=right | 2.8 km || 
|-id=454 bgcolor=#d6d6d6
| 296454 ||  || — || April 23, 2009 || Kitt Peak || Spacewatch || — || align=right | 3.2 km || 
|-id=455 bgcolor=#d6d6d6
| 296455 ||  || — || April 18, 2009 || Catalina || CSS || — || align=right | 5.5 km || 
|-id=456 bgcolor=#E9E9E9
| 296456 ||  || — || April 19, 2009 || Catalina || CSS || — || align=right | 2.6 km || 
|-id=457 bgcolor=#fefefe
| 296457 ||  || — || April 26, 2009 || Siding Spring || SSS || — || align=right | 2.5 km || 
|-id=458 bgcolor=#E9E9E9
| 296458 ||  || — || April 26, 2009 || Kitt Peak || Spacewatch || — || align=right data-sort-value="0.97" | 970 m || 
|-id=459 bgcolor=#fefefe
| 296459 ||  || — || April 26, 2009 || Kitt Peak || Spacewatch || V || align=right data-sort-value="0.79" | 790 m || 
|-id=460 bgcolor=#d6d6d6
| 296460 ||  || — || April 28, 2009 || Catalina || CSS || — || align=right | 3.2 km || 
|-id=461 bgcolor=#d6d6d6
| 296461 ||  || — || April 29, 2009 || Mount Lemmon || Mount Lemmon Survey || — || align=right | 3.4 km || 
|-id=462 bgcolor=#E9E9E9
| 296462 Corylachlan ||  ||  || April 23, 2009 || Zadko || M. Todd || — || align=right | 1.4 km || 
|-id=463 bgcolor=#d6d6d6
| 296463 ||  || — || April 27, 2009 || Kitt Peak || Spacewatch || SAN || align=right | 1.8 km || 
|-id=464 bgcolor=#E9E9E9
| 296464 ||  || — || April 27, 2009 || Kitt Peak || Spacewatch || — || align=right | 1.1 km || 
|-id=465 bgcolor=#E9E9E9
| 296465 ||  || — || April 24, 2009 || La Sagra || OAM Obs. || — || align=right | 2.2 km || 
|-id=466 bgcolor=#fefefe
| 296466 ||  || — || April 23, 2009 || La Sagra || OAM Obs. || NYS || align=right data-sort-value="0.79" | 790 m || 
|-id=467 bgcolor=#fefefe
| 296467 ||  || — || April 30, 2009 || La Sagra || OAM Obs. || — || align=right | 1.1 km || 
|-id=468 bgcolor=#fefefe
| 296468 ||  || — || April 20, 2009 || Mount Lemmon || Mount Lemmon Survey || — || align=right data-sort-value="0.91" | 910 m || 
|-id=469 bgcolor=#fefefe
| 296469 ||  || — || April 22, 2009 || La Sagra || OAM Obs. || — || align=right data-sort-value="0.80" | 800 m || 
|-id=470 bgcolor=#d6d6d6
| 296470 ||  || — || April 29, 2009 || Kitt Peak || Spacewatch || — || align=right | 3.2 km || 
|-id=471 bgcolor=#E9E9E9
| 296471 ||  || — || April 30, 2009 || Kitt Peak || Spacewatch || — || align=right | 2.9 km || 
|-id=472 bgcolor=#fefefe
| 296472 ||  || — || April 28, 2009 || Moletai || K. Černis, J. Zdanavičius || — || align=right | 1.0 km || 
|-id=473 bgcolor=#E9E9E9
| 296473 ||  || — || April 20, 2009 || Mount Lemmon || Mount Lemmon Survey || MRX || align=right | 1.2 km || 
|-id=474 bgcolor=#d6d6d6
| 296474 ||  || — || April 17, 2009 || Kitt Peak || Spacewatch || — || align=right | 2.9 km || 
|-id=475 bgcolor=#E9E9E9
| 296475 ||  || — || April 19, 2009 || Catalina || CSS || — || align=right | 1.5 km || 
|-id=476 bgcolor=#d6d6d6
| 296476 ||  || — || April 19, 2009 || Kitt Peak || Spacewatch || — || align=right | 3.7 km || 
|-id=477 bgcolor=#fefefe
| 296477 ||  || — || April 22, 2009 || Mount Lemmon || Mount Lemmon Survey || FLO || align=right data-sort-value="0.84" | 840 m || 
|-id=478 bgcolor=#fefefe
| 296478 ||  || — || April 19, 2009 || Kitt Peak || Spacewatch || — || align=right data-sort-value="0.89" | 890 m || 
|-id=479 bgcolor=#d6d6d6
| 296479 ||  || — || April 20, 2009 || Kitt Peak || Spacewatch || — || align=right | 4.8 km || 
|-id=480 bgcolor=#E9E9E9
| 296480 ||  || — || April 18, 2009 || Kitt Peak || Spacewatch || — || align=right data-sort-value="0.94" | 940 m || 
|-id=481 bgcolor=#fefefe
| 296481 ||  || — || April 22, 2009 || Mount Lemmon || Mount Lemmon Survey || — || align=right | 1.1 km || 
|-id=482 bgcolor=#fefefe
| 296482 ||  || — || April 17, 2009 || Kitt Peak || Spacewatch || NYS || align=right data-sort-value="0.76" | 760 m || 
|-id=483 bgcolor=#E9E9E9
| 296483 ||  || — || April 18, 2009 || Kitt Peak || Spacewatch || — || align=right | 2.4 km || 
|-id=484 bgcolor=#d6d6d6
| 296484 ||  || — || April 20, 2009 || Kitt Peak || Spacewatch || 7:4 || align=right | 5.7 km || 
|-id=485 bgcolor=#E9E9E9
| 296485 ||  || — || April 29, 2009 || Kitt Peak || Spacewatch || — || align=right data-sort-value="0.90" | 900 m || 
|-id=486 bgcolor=#fefefe
| 296486 ||  || — || April 29, 2009 || Kitt Peak || Spacewatch || FLO || align=right data-sort-value="0.61" | 610 m || 
|-id=487 bgcolor=#E9E9E9
| 296487 ||  || — || April 30, 2009 || Mount Lemmon || Mount Lemmon Survey || — || align=right | 1.1 km || 
|-id=488 bgcolor=#fefefe
| 296488 ||  || — || May 3, 2009 || La Sagra || OAM Obs. || V || align=right data-sort-value="0.91" | 910 m || 
|-id=489 bgcolor=#E9E9E9
| 296489 ||  || — || May 4, 2009 || La Sagra || OAM Obs. || — || align=right | 1.5 km || 
|-id=490 bgcolor=#fefefe
| 296490 ||  || — || May 4, 2009 || La Sagra || OAM Obs. || — || align=right | 1.1 km || 
|-id=491 bgcolor=#fefefe
| 296491 ||  || — || May 2, 2009 || La Sagra || OAM Obs. || EUT || align=right data-sort-value="0.70" | 700 m || 
|-id=492 bgcolor=#fefefe
| 296492 ||  || — || May 2, 2009 || Purple Mountain || PMO NEO || H || align=right data-sort-value="0.92" | 920 m || 
|-id=493 bgcolor=#d6d6d6
| 296493 ||  || — || May 2, 2009 || Kitt Peak || Spacewatch || — || align=right | 5.5 km || 
|-id=494 bgcolor=#fefefe
| 296494 ||  || — || May 2, 2009 || Siding Spring || SSS || FLO || align=right data-sort-value="0.75" | 750 m || 
|-id=495 bgcolor=#E9E9E9
| 296495 ||  || — || May 14, 2009 || Mayhill || A. Lowe || — || align=right | 2.5 km || 
|-id=496 bgcolor=#d6d6d6
| 296496 ||  || — || May 13, 2009 || Kitt Peak || Spacewatch || EOS || align=right | 2.7 km || 
|-id=497 bgcolor=#fefefe
| 296497 ||  || — || May 14, 2009 || Kitt Peak || Spacewatch || MAS || align=right data-sort-value="0.78" | 780 m || 
|-id=498 bgcolor=#d6d6d6
| 296498 ||  || — || May 15, 2009 || Catalina || CSS || — || align=right | 3.9 km || 
|-id=499 bgcolor=#C2FFFF
| 296499 ||  || — || May 3, 2009 || Mount Lemmon || Mount Lemmon Survey || L5 || align=right | 11 km || 
|-id=500 bgcolor=#d6d6d6
| 296500 ||  || — || May 13, 2009 || Kitt Peak || Spacewatch || EOS || align=right | 2.2 km || 
|}

296501–296600 

|-bgcolor=#d6d6d6
| 296501 ||  || — || May 15, 2009 || Kitt Peak || Spacewatch || — || align=right | 3.7 km || 
|-id=502 bgcolor=#d6d6d6
| 296502 ||  || — || May 15, 2009 || Kitt Peak || Spacewatch || HYG || align=right | 3.1 km || 
|-id=503 bgcolor=#fefefe
| 296503 || 2009 KW || — || May 16, 2009 || Sierra Stars || R. Matson || — || align=right | 1.4 km || 
|-id=504 bgcolor=#d6d6d6
| 296504 ||  || — || May 18, 2009 || Mayhill || A. Lowe || — || align=right | 3.6 km || 
|-id=505 bgcolor=#E9E9E9
| 296505 ||  || — || May 19, 2009 || Tzec Maun || F. Tozzi || — || align=right | 1.6 km || 
|-id=506 bgcolor=#fefefe
| 296506 ||  || — || May 23, 2009 || Sierra Stars || R. Matson || V || align=right data-sort-value="0.71" | 710 m || 
|-id=507 bgcolor=#d6d6d6
| 296507 ||  || — || May 24, 2009 || Kitt Peak || Spacewatch || EUP || align=right | 4.8 km || 
|-id=508 bgcolor=#E9E9E9
| 296508 ||  || — || May 27, 2009 || La Sagra || OAM Obs. || RAF || align=right | 1.4 km || 
|-id=509 bgcolor=#E9E9E9
| 296509 ||  || — || May 25, 2009 || Kitt Peak || Spacewatch || — || align=right | 1.1 km || 
|-id=510 bgcolor=#d6d6d6
| 296510 ||  || — || May 25, 2009 || Kitt Peak || Spacewatch || VER || align=right | 4.3 km || 
|-id=511 bgcolor=#E9E9E9
| 296511 ||  || — || May 28, 2009 || Mount Lemmon || Mount Lemmon Survey || — || align=right | 2.8 km || 
|-id=512 bgcolor=#d6d6d6
| 296512 ||  || — || May 28, 2009 || Kitt Peak || Spacewatch || — || align=right | 4.0 km || 
|-id=513 bgcolor=#C2FFFF
| 296513 ||  || — || May 25, 2009 || Mount Lemmon || Mount Lemmon Survey || L5ENM || align=right | 10 km || 
|-id=514 bgcolor=#E9E9E9
| 296514 ||  || — || May 27, 2009 || Kitt Peak || Spacewatch || GER || align=right | 2.7 km || 
|-id=515 bgcolor=#d6d6d6
| 296515 ||  || — || May 30, 2009 || Mount Lemmon || Mount Lemmon Survey || MEL || align=right | 3.6 km || 
|-id=516 bgcolor=#d6d6d6
| 296516 || 2009 LJ || — || June 2, 2009 || Skylive Obs. || F. Tozzi || EUP || align=right | 3.8 km || 
|-id=517 bgcolor=#d6d6d6
| 296517 ||  || — || June 12, 2009 || Kitt Peak || Spacewatch || EOS || align=right | 2.5 km || 
|-id=518 bgcolor=#fefefe
| 296518 ||  || — || June 13, 2009 || Bergisch Gladbac || W. Bickel || — || align=right | 1.2 km || 
|-id=519 bgcolor=#fefefe
| 296519 ||  || — || June 15, 2009 || Mount Lemmon || Mount Lemmon Survey || V || align=right data-sort-value="0.72" | 720 m || 
|-id=520 bgcolor=#d6d6d6
| 296520 ||  || — || June 17, 2009 || Mount Lemmon || Mount Lemmon Survey || EUP || align=right | 4.8 km || 
|-id=521 bgcolor=#fefefe
| 296521 ||  || — || June 29, 2009 || Eskridge || G. Hug || NYS || align=right data-sort-value="0.88" | 880 m || 
|-id=522 bgcolor=#E9E9E9
| 296522 ||  || — || July 16, 2009 || La Sagra || OAM Obs. || — || align=right | 2.7 km || 
|-id=523 bgcolor=#fefefe
| 296523 ||  || — || July 18, 2009 || La Sagra || OAM Obs. || V || align=right data-sort-value="0.76" | 760 m || 
|-id=524 bgcolor=#d6d6d6
| 296524 ||  || — || July 19, 2009 || Črni Vrh || Črni Vrh || — || align=right | 4.7 km || 
|-id=525 bgcolor=#d6d6d6
| 296525 Milanovskiy ||  ||  || July 20, 2009 || Zelenchukskaya || T. V. Kryachko || — || align=right | 4.7 km || 
|-id=526 bgcolor=#fefefe
| 296526 ||  || — || July 26, 2009 || Dauban || F. Kugel || V || align=right data-sort-value="0.99" | 990 m || 
|-id=527 bgcolor=#fefefe
| 296527 ||  || — || July 27, 2009 || Catalina || CSS || — || align=right data-sort-value="0.93" | 930 m || 
|-id=528 bgcolor=#fefefe
| 296528 ||  || — || July 19, 2009 || La Sagra || OAM Obs. || NYS || align=right data-sort-value="0.70" | 700 m || 
|-id=529 bgcolor=#E9E9E9
| 296529 ||  || — || July 28, 2009 || La Sagra || OAM Obs. || — || align=right | 1.5 km || 
|-id=530 bgcolor=#E9E9E9
| 296530 ||  || — || July 28, 2009 || Tzec Maun || E. Schwab || — || align=right data-sort-value="0.85" | 850 m || 
|-id=531 bgcolor=#fefefe
| 296531 ||  || — || July 29, 2009 || La Sagra || OAM Obs. || V || align=right data-sort-value="0.89" | 890 m || 
|-id=532 bgcolor=#d6d6d6
| 296532 ||  || — || July 28, 2009 || Catalina || CSS || HYG || align=right | 2.6 km || 
|-id=533 bgcolor=#d6d6d6
| 296533 ||  || — || July 27, 2009 || Kitt Peak || Spacewatch || — || align=right | 4.1 km || 
|-id=534 bgcolor=#E9E9E9
| 296534 ||  || — || July 28, 2009 || Kitt Peak || Spacewatch || XIZ || align=right | 1.4 km || 
|-id=535 bgcolor=#E9E9E9
| 296535 ||  || — || July 28, 2009 || Kitt Peak || Spacewatch || — || align=right | 1.0 km || 
|-id=536 bgcolor=#fefefe
| 296536 ||  || — || July 28, 2009 || Kitt Peak || Spacewatch || — || align=right data-sort-value="0.77" | 770 m || 
|-id=537 bgcolor=#d6d6d6
| 296537 ||  || — || July 28, 2009 || Kitt Peak || Spacewatch || — || align=right | 4.1 km || 
|-id=538 bgcolor=#d6d6d6
| 296538 ||  || — || July 29, 2009 || La Sagra || OAM Obs. || EOS || align=right | 3.1 km || 
|-id=539 bgcolor=#d6d6d6
| 296539 ||  || — || July 25, 2009 || La Sagra || OAM Obs. || NAE || align=right | 3.4 km || 
|-id=540 bgcolor=#E9E9E9
| 296540 ||  || — || July 20, 2009 || Siding Spring || SSS || — || align=right | 3.0 km || 
|-id=541 bgcolor=#d6d6d6
| 296541 ||  || — || July 28, 2009 || Kitt Peak || Spacewatch || — || align=right | 4.3 km || 
|-id=542 bgcolor=#fefefe
| 296542 ||  || — || July 24, 2009 || Socorro || LINEAR || — || align=right | 1.3 km || 
|-id=543 bgcolor=#E9E9E9
| 296543 ||  || — || August 11, 2009 || Socorro || LINEAR || — || align=right | 3.2 km || 
|-id=544 bgcolor=#fefefe
| 296544 ||  || — || August 15, 2009 || Mayhill || A. Lowe || — || align=right | 1.1 km || 
|-id=545 bgcolor=#d6d6d6
| 296545 ||  || — || August 15, 2009 || La Sagra || OAM Obs. || HIL3:2 || align=right | 6.8 km || 
|-id=546 bgcolor=#E9E9E9
| 296546 ||  || — || August 15, 2009 || Kitt Peak || Spacewatch || AGN || align=right | 1.3 km || 
|-id=547 bgcolor=#d6d6d6
| 296547 ||  || — || December 28, 2005 || Catalina || CSS || EOS || align=right | 3.1 km || 
|-id=548 bgcolor=#fefefe
| 296548 ||  || — || August 15, 2009 || Catalina || CSS || NYS || align=right data-sort-value="0.93" | 930 m || 
|-id=549 bgcolor=#d6d6d6
| 296549 ||  || — || August 1, 2009 || Catalina || CSS || — || align=right | 4.6 km || 
|-id=550 bgcolor=#fefefe
| 296550 ||  || — || August 15, 2009 || Kitt Peak || Spacewatch || — || align=right data-sort-value="0.74" | 740 m || 
|-id=551 bgcolor=#E9E9E9
| 296551 ||  || — || August 16, 2009 || Vicques || M. Ory || — || align=right | 2.2 km || 
|-id=552 bgcolor=#d6d6d6
| 296552 ||  || — || August 18, 2009 || Bergisch Gladbac || W. Bickel || — || align=right | 3.9 km || 
|-id=553 bgcolor=#fefefe
| 296553 ||  || — || August 16, 2009 || La Sagra || OAM Obs. || MAS || align=right | 1.0 km || 
|-id=554 bgcolor=#d6d6d6
| 296554 ||  || — || August 16, 2009 || Kitt Peak || Spacewatch || HYG || align=right | 3.3 km || 
|-id=555 bgcolor=#d6d6d6
| 296555 ||  || — || August 17, 2009 || La Sagra || OAM Obs. || SHU3:2 || align=right | 6.9 km || 
|-id=556 bgcolor=#fefefe
| 296556 ||  || — || August 16, 2009 || Kitt Peak || Spacewatch || — || align=right | 1.00 km || 
|-id=557 bgcolor=#E9E9E9
| 296557 ||  || — || August 16, 2009 || Kitt Peak || Spacewatch || — || align=right | 1.6 km || 
|-id=558 bgcolor=#E9E9E9
| 296558 ||  || — || August 16, 2009 || Catalina || CSS || TIN || align=right | 1.6 km || 
|-id=559 bgcolor=#fefefe
| 296559 ||  || — || August 22, 2009 || Guidestar || M. Emmerich, S. Melchert || V || align=right data-sort-value="0.82" | 820 m || 
|-id=560 bgcolor=#fefefe
| 296560 ||  || — || August 20, 2009 || Drebach || Drebach Obs. || MAS || align=right data-sort-value="0.81" | 810 m || 
|-id=561 bgcolor=#d6d6d6
| 296561 ||  || — || August 24, 2009 || La Sagra || OAM Obs. || EOS || align=right | 3.1 km || 
|-id=562 bgcolor=#d6d6d6
| 296562 ||  || — || August 25, 2009 || Modra || Š. Gajdoš, J. Világi || — || align=right | 4.5 km || 
|-id=563 bgcolor=#E9E9E9
| 296563 ||  || — || August 29, 2009 || Tzec Maun || L. Elenin || — || align=right | 1.8 km || 
|-id=564 bgcolor=#E9E9E9
| 296564 ||  || — || August 29, 2009 || Bergisch Gladbac || W. Bickel || — || align=right | 2.6 km || 
|-id=565 bgcolor=#fefefe
| 296565 ||  || — || August 26, 2009 || La Sagra || OAM Obs. || MAS || align=right data-sort-value="0.81" | 810 m || 
|-id=566 bgcolor=#fefefe
| 296566 ||  || — || August 26, 2009 || La Sagra || OAM Obs. || — || align=right data-sort-value="0.97" | 970 m || 
|-id=567 bgcolor=#E9E9E9
| 296567 ||  || — || August 27, 2009 || La Sagra || OAM Obs. || — || align=right | 2.7 km || 
|-id=568 bgcolor=#d6d6d6
| 296568 ||  || — || August 27, 2009 || Kitt Peak || Spacewatch || — || align=right | 4.8 km || 
|-id=569 bgcolor=#d6d6d6
| 296569 ||  || — || August 27, 2009 || Kitt Peak || Spacewatch || — || align=right | 2.5 km || 
|-id=570 bgcolor=#E9E9E9
| 296570 ||  || — || November 1, 2005 || Mount Lemmon || Mount Lemmon Survey || AEO || align=right | 1.00 km || 
|-id=571 bgcolor=#fefefe
| 296571 ||  || — || August 29, 2009 || Kitt Peak || Spacewatch || — || align=right | 1.1 km || 
|-id=572 bgcolor=#d6d6d6
| 296572 ||  || — || August 27, 2009 || La Sagra || OAM Obs. || VER || align=right | 3.5 km || 
|-id=573 bgcolor=#d6d6d6
| 296573 ||  || — || August 27, 2009 || Kitt Peak || Spacewatch || — || align=right | 2.5 km || 
|-id=574 bgcolor=#d6d6d6
| 296574 ||  || — || August 27, 2009 || Kitt Peak || Spacewatch || THMcritical || align=right | 1.7 km || 
|-id=575 bgcolor=#E9E9E9
| 296575 ||  || — || August 16, 2009 || Kitt Peak || Spacewatch || — || align=right | 2.1 km || 
|-id=576 bgcolor=#d6d6d6
| 296576 ||  || — || August 27, 2009 || Kitt Peak || Spacewatch || — || align=right | 2.5 km || 
|-id=577 bgcolor=#d6d6d6
| 296577 Arkhangelsk ||  ||  || September 11, 2009 || Zelenchukskaya || T. V. Kryachko || — || align=right | 4.2 km || 
|-id=578 bgcolor=#d6d6d6
| 296578 ||  || — || September 13, 2009 || Dauban || F. Kugel || — || align=right | 4.1 km || 
|-id=579 bgcolor=#fefefe
| 296579 ||  || — || September 13, 2009 || Dauban || F. Kugel || NYS || align=right data-sort-value="0.84" | 840 m || 
|-id=580 bgcolor=#d6d6d6
| 296580 ||  || — || September 11, 2009 || La Sagra || OAM Obs. || — || align=right | 2.9 km || 
|-id=581 bgcolor=#C2FFFF
| 296581 ||  || — || September 12, 2009 || Kitt Peak || Spacewatch || L4ERY || align=right | 9.8 km || 
|-id=582 bgcolor=#d6d6d6
| 296582 ||  || — || September 12, 2009 || Kitt Peak || Spacewatch || THM || align=right | 2.3 km || 
|-id=583 bgcolor=#E9E9E9
| 296583 ||  || — || September 12, 2009 || Kitt Peak || Spacewatch || — || align=right | 1.2 km || 
|-id=584 bgcolor=#d6d6d6
| 296584 ||  || — || September 12, 2009 || Kitt Peak || Spacewatch || — || align=right | 3.4 km || 
|-id=585 bgcolor=#fefefe
| 296585 ||  || — || September 13, 2009 || Purple Mountain || PMO NEO || — || align=right | 1.4 km || 
|-id=586 bgcolor=#fefefe
| 296586 ||  || — || September 15, 2009 || Kitt Peak || Spacewatch || MAS || align=right data-sort-value="0.76" | 760 m || 
|-id=587 bgcolor=#E9E9E9
| 296587 ||  || — || September 13, 2009 || ESA OGS || ESA OGS || — || align=right | 2.4 km || 
|-id=588 bgcolor=#C2FFFF
| 296588 ||  || — || September 14, 2009 || Kitt Peak || Spacewatch || L4 || align=right | 12 km || 
|-id=589 bgcolor=#d6d6d6
| 296589 ||  || — || September 14, 2009 || Kitt Peak || Spacewatch || — || align=right | 5.1 km || 
|-id=590 bgcolor=#fefefe
| 296590 ||  || — || September 14, 2009 || Kitt Peak || Spacewatch || — || align=right data-sort-value="0.93" | 930 m || 
|-id=591 bgcolor=#E9E9E9
| 296591 ||  || — || September 14, 2009 || Kitt Peak || Spacewatch || — || align=right | 2.2 km || 
|-id=592 bgcolor=#C2FFFF
| 296592 ||  || — || September 14, 2009 || Kitt Peak || Spacewatch || L4 || align=right | 10 km || 
|-id=593 bgcolor=#E9E9E9
| 296593 ||  || — || September 14, 2009 || Kitt Peak || Spacewatch || — || align=right | 1.0 km || 
|-id=594 bgcolor=#d6d6d6
| 296594 ||  || — || September 15, 2009 || Kitt Peak || Spacewatch || — || align=right | 2.3 km || 
|-id=595 bgcolor=#E9E9E9
| 296595 ||  || — || September 15, 2009 || Kitt Peak || Spacewatch || RAF || align=right | 3.5 km || 
|-id=596 bgcolor=#d6d6d6
| 296596 ||  || — || September 15, 2009 || Kitt Peak || Spacewatch || — || align=right | 3.3 km || 
|-id=597 bgcolor=#d6d6d6
| 296597 ||  || — || September 15, 2009 || Kitt Peak || Spacewatch || — || align=right | 3.2 km || 
|-id=598 bgcolor=#d6d6d6
| 296598 ||  || — || September 15, 2009 || Kitt Peak || Spacewatch || THM || align=right | 2.5 km || 
|-id=599 bgcolor=#E9E9E9
| 296599 ||  || — || September 15, 2009 || Kitt Peak || Spacewatch || HOF || align=right | 2.8 km || 
|-id=600 bgcolor=#d6d6d6
| 296600 ||  || — || September 15, 2009 || Kitt Peak || Spacewatch || — || align=right | 2.9 km || 
|}

296601–296700 

|-bgcolor=#d6d6d6
| 296601 ||  || — || September 15, 2009 || Kitt Peak || Spacewatch || — || align=right | 3.7 km || 
|-id=602 bgcolor=#E9E9E9
| 296602 ||  || — || September 14, 2009 || Catalina || CSS || — || align=right | 2.1 km || 
|-id=603 bgcolor=#C2FFFF
| 296603 ||  || — || September 15, 2009 || Kitt Peak || Spacewatch || L4 || align=right | 10 km || 
|-id=604 bgcolor=#C2FFFF
| 296604 ||  || — || September 15, 2009 || Kitt Peak || Spacewatch || L4ERY || align=right | 9.8 km || 
|-id=605 bgcolor=#d6d6d6
| 296605 ||  || — || September 15, 2009 || Kitt Peak || Spacewatch || — || align=right | 3.9 km || 
|-id=606 bgcolor=#d6d6d6
| 296606 ||  || — || September 14, 2009 || Kitt Peak || Spacewatch || — || align=right | 4.3 km || 
|-id=607 bgcolor=#fefefe
| 296607 ||  || — || September 15, 2009 || Kitt Peak || Spacewatch || NYS || align=right data-sort-value="0.76" | 760 m || 
|-id=608 bgcolor=#d6d6d6
| 296608 ||  || — || November 10, 2005 || Mount Lemmon || Mount Lemmon Survey || — || align=right | 2.0 km || 
|-id=609 bgcolor=#fefefe
| 296609 ||  || — || September 14, 2009 || Socorro || LINEAR || FLO || align=right data-sort-value="0.72" | 720 m || 
|-id=610 bgcolor=#E9E9E9
| 296610 ||  || — || September 16, 2009 || Mount Lemmon || Mount Lemmon Survey || — || align=right | 1.7 km || 
|-id=611 bgcolor=#E9E9E9
| 296611 ||  || — || September 16, 2009 || Mount Lemmon || Mount Lemmon Survey || — || align=right | 3.2 km || 
|-id=612 bgcolor=#fefefe
| 296612 ||  || — || September 18, 2009 || Nazaret || G. Muler || — || align=right data-sort-value="0.97" | 970 m || 
|-id=613 bgcolor=#d6d6d6
| 296613 ||  || — || September 16, 2009 || Mount Lemmon || Mount Lemmon Survey || — || align=right | 2.7 km || 
|-id=614 bgcolor=#fefefe
| 296614 ||  || — || September 17, 2009 || Catalina || CSS || — || align=right data-sort-value="0.86" | 860 m || 
|-id=615 bgcolor=#d6d6d6
| 296615 ||  || — || September 21, 2009 || Bergisch Gladbac || W. Bickel || TEL || align=right | 2.0 km || 
|-id=616 bgcolor=#fefefe
| 296616 ||  || — || September 16, 2009 || Kitt Peak || Spacewatch || KLI || align=right | 2.0 km || 
|-id=617 bgcolor=#E9E9E9
| 296617 ||  || — || September 16, 2009 || Kitt Peak || Spacewatch || — || align=right | 3.0 km || 
|-id=618 bgcolor=#E9E9E9
| 296618 ||  || — || September 16, 2009 || Kitt Peak || Spacewatch || WIT || align=right data-sort-value="0.95" | 950 m || 
|-id=619 bgcolor=#E9E9E9
| 296619 ||  || — || December 14, 2006 || Mount Lemmon || Mount Lemmon Survey || — || align=right | 1.3 km || 
|-id=620 bgcolor=#E9E9E9
| 296620 ||  || — || September 16, 2009 || Kitt Peak || Spacewatch || PAD || align=right | 1.5 km || 
|-id=621 bgcolor=#fefefe
| 296621 ||  || — || September 16, 2009 || Kitt Peak || Spacewatch || — || align=right | 1.1 km || 
|-id=622 bgcolor=#d6d6d6
| 296622 ||  || — || September 16, 2009 || Kitt Peak || Spacewatch || — || align=right | 3.7 km || 
|-id=623 bgcolor=#d6d6d6
| 296623 ||  || — || September 16, 2009 || Kitt Peak || Spacewatch || — || align=right | 3.4 km || 
|-id=624 bgcolor=#fefefe
| 296624 ||  || — || September 17, 2009 || Mount Lemmon || Mount Lemmon Survey || V || align=right data-sort-value="0.99" | 990 m || 
|-id=625 bgcolor=#fefefe
| 296625 ||  || — || September 17, 2009 || Kitt Peak || Spacewatch || NYS || align=right data-sort-value="0.60" | 600 m || 
|-id=626 bgcolor=#fefefe
| 296626 ||  || — || September 17, 2009 || Catalina || CSS || FLO || align=right data-sort-value="0.88" | 880 m || 
|-id=627 bgcolor=#E9E9E9
| 296627 ||  || — || September 17, 2009 || Mount Lemmon || Mount Lemmon Survey || — || align=right | 2.1 km || 
|-id=628 bgcolor=#C2FFFF
| 296628 ||  || — || September 17, 2009 || Kitt Peak || Spacewatch || L4 || align=right | 9.8 km || 
|-id=629 bgcolor=#fefefe
| 296629 ||  || — || September 17, 2009 || Kitt Peak || Spacewatch || — || align=right data-sort-value="0.83" | 830 m || 
|-id=630 bgcolor=#d6d6d6
| 296630 ||  || — || September 17, 2009 || Kitt Peak || Spacewatch || VER || align=right | 4.1 km || 
|-id=631 bgcolor=#fefefe
| 296631 ||  || — || September 17, 2009 || Kitt Peak || Spacewatch || FLO || align=right data-sort-value="0.76" | 760 m || 
|-id=632 bgcolor=#d6d6d6
| 296632 ||  || — || September 17, 2009 || Kitt Peak || Spacewatch || — || align=right | 2.4 km || 
|-id=633 bgcolor=#E9E9E9
| 296633 ||  || — || September 17, 2009 || Mount Lemmon || Mount Lemmon Survey || — || align=right | 2.3 km || 
|-id=634 bgcolor=#C2FFFF
| 296634 ||  || — || September 17, 2009 || Kitt Peak || Spacewatch || L4ARK || align=right | 13 km || 
|-id=635 bgcolor=#E9E9E9
| 296635 ||  || — || September 17, 2009 || Kitt Peak || Spacewatch || — || align=right | 1.1 km || 
|-id=636 bgcolor=#d6d6d6
| 296636 ||  || — || September 17, 2009 || Kitt Peak || Spacewatch || — || align=right | 4.1 km || 
|-id=637 bgcolor=#E9E9E9
| 296637 ||  || — || September 18, 2009 || Kitt Peak || Spacewatch || MRX || align=right data-sort-value="0.95" | 950 m || 
|-id=638 bgcolor=#d6d6d6
| 296638 Sergeibelov ||  ||  || September 23, 2009 || Zelenchukskaya || T. V. Kryachko || — || align=right | 5.1 km || 
|-id=639 bgcolor=#fefefe
| 296639 ||  || — || September 23, 2009 || Dauban || F. Kugel || V || align=right data-sort-value="0.92" | 920 m || 
|-id=640 bgcolor=#d6d6d6
| 296640 ||  || — || September 16, 2009 || Mount Lemmon || Mount Lemmon Survey || 3:2 || align=right | 4.8 km || 
|-id=641 bgcolor=#E9E9E9
| 296641 ||  || — || September 17, 2009 || Kitt Peak || Spacewatch || — || align=right | 2.8 km || 
|-id=642 bgcolor=#d6d6d6
| 296642 ||  || — || September 18, 2009 || Kitt Peak || Spacewatch || 7:4 || align=right | 3.4 km || 
|-id=643 bgcolor=#d6d6d6
| 296643 ||  || — || September 18, 2009 || Kitt Peak || Spacewatch || — || align=right | 3.0 km || 
|-id=644 bgcolor=#E9E9E9
| 296644 ||  || — || September 18, 2009 || Kitt Peak || Spacewatch || AGN || align=right | 1.3 km || 
|-id=645 bgcolor=#fefefe
| 296645 ||  || — || September 18, 2009 || Kitt Peak || Spacewatch || — || align=right data-sort-value="0.74" | 740 m || 
|-id=646 bgcolor=#fefefe
| 296646 ||  || — || September 18, 2009 || Kitt Peak || Spacewatch || FLO || align=right data-sort-value="0.95" | 950 m || 
|-id=647 bgcolor=#E9E9E9
| 296647 ||  || — || September 18, 2009 || Kitt Peak || Spacewatch || AGN || align=right | 1.3 km || 
|-id=648 bgcolor=#C2FFFF
| 296648 ||  || — || September 18, 2009 || Kitt Peak || Spacewatch || L4 || align=right | 12 km || 
|-id=649 bgcolor=#d6d6d6
| 296649 ||  || — || September 18, 2009 || Kitt Peak || Spacewatch || — || align=right | 3.8 km || 
|-id=650 bgcolor=#E9E9E9
| 296650 ||  || — || September 18, 2009 || Kitt Peak || Spacewatch || — || align=right | 1.4 km || 
|-id=651 bgcolor=#d6d6d6
| 296651 ||  || — || September 18, 2009 || Kitt Peak || Spacewatch || KOR || align=right | 1.7 km || 
|-id=652 bgcolor=#E9E9E9
| 296652 ||  || — || September 18, 2009 || Kitt Peak || Spacewatch || AGN || align=right | 1.4 km || 
|-id=653 bgcolor=#d6d6d6
| 296653 ||  || — || September 18, 2009 || Kitt Peak || Spacewatch || — || align=right | 3.0 km || 
|-id=654 bgcolor=#C2FFFF
| 296654 ||  || — || September 18, 2009 || Kitt Peak || Spacewatch || L4 || align=right | 7.7 km || 
|-id=655 bgcolor=#d6d6d6
| 296655 ||  || — || September 18, 2009 || Kitt Peak || Spacewatch || K-2 || align=right | 1.3 km || 
|-id=656 bgcolor=#d6d6d6
| 296656 ||  || — || September 18, 2009 || Purple Mountain || PMO NEO || — || align=right | 3.5 km || 
|-id=657 bgcolor=#fefefe
| 296657 ||  || — || September 19, 2009 || Kitt Peak || Spacewatch || — || align=right data-sort-value="0.83" | 830 m || 
|-id=658 bgcolor=#fefefe
| 296658 ||  || — || September 19, 2009 || Kitt Peak || Spacewatch || — || align=right data-sort-value="0.90" | 900 m || 
|-id=659 bgcolor=#d6d6d6
| 296659 ||  || — || September 19, 2009 || Kitt Peak || Spacewatch || K-2 || align=right | 1.6 km || 
|-id=660 bgcolor=#d6d6d6
| 296660 ||  || — || September 20, 2009 || Kitt Peak || Spacewatch || 7:4 || align=right | 5.0 km || 
|-id=661 bgcolor=#E9E9E9
| 296661 ||  || — || September 20, 2009 || Kitt Peak || Spacewatch || — || align=right | 2.8 km || 
|-id=662 bgcolor=#E9E9E9
| 296662 ||  || — || March 14, 2007 || Kitt Peak || Spacewatch || — || align=right | 2.0 km || 
|-id=663 bgcolor=#d6d6d6
| 296663 ||  || — || September 20, 2009 || Kitt Peak || Spacewatch || — || align=right | 2.8 km || 
|-id=664 bgcolor=#C2FFFF
| 296664 ||  || — || September 20, 2009 || Kitt Peak || Spacewatch || L4 || align=right | 9.5 km || 
|-id=665 bgcolor=#C2FFFF
| 296665 ||  || — || September 20, 2009 || Kitt Peak || Spacewatch || L4 || align=right | 11 km || 
|-id=666 bgcolor=#C2FFFF
| 296666 ||  || — || September 20, 2009 || Kitt Peak || Spacewatch || L4 || align=right | 13 km || 
|-id=667 bgcolor=#C2FFFF
| 296667 ||  || — || September 20, 2009 || Kitt Peak || Spacewatch || L4 || align=right | 11 km || 
|-id=668 bgcolor=#E9E9E9
| 296668 ||  || — || September 20, 2009 || Kitt Peak || Spacewatch || AEO || align=right | 1.3 km || 
|-id=669 bgcolor=#d6d6d6
| 296669 ||  || — || September 21, 2009 || Mount Lemmon || Mount Lemmon Survey || THM || align=right | 3.1 km || 
|-id=670 bgcolor=#E9E9E9
| 296670 ||  || — || September 21, 2009 || Kitt Peak || Spacewatch || PAD || align=right | 2.6 km || 
|-id=671 bgcolor=#C2FFFF
| 296671 ||  || — || September 23, 2009 || Mount Lemmon || Mount Lemmon Survey || L4 || align=right | 9.2 km || 
|-id=672 bgcolor=#C2FFFF
| 296672 ||  || — || September 18, 2009 || Catalina || CSS || L4 || align=right | 16 km || 
|-id=673 bgcolor=#fefefe
| 296673 ||  || — || September 21, 2009 || Kitt Peak || Spacewatch || — || align=right | 1.2 km || 
|-id=674 bgcolor=#C2FFFF
| 296674 ||  || — || September 21, 2009 || Kitt Peak || Spacewatch || L4 || align=right | 10 km || 
|-id=675 bgcolor=#E9E9E9
| 296675 ||  || — || September 22, 2009 || Kitt Peak || Spacewatch || — || align=right | 3.0 km || 
|-id=676 bgcolor=#d6d6d6
| 296676 ||  || — || September 22, 2009 || Kitt Peak || Spacewatch || — || align=right | 3.6 km || 
|-id=677 bgcolor=#fefefe
| 296677 ||  || — || September 23, 2009 || Kitt Peak || Spacewatch || — || align=right data-sort-value="0.78" | 780 m || 
|-id=678 bgcolor=#fefefe
| 296678 ||  || — || September 23, 2009 || Mount Lemmon || Mount Lemmon Survey || NYS || align=right data-sort-value="0.79" | 790 m || 
|-id=679 bgcolor=#E9E9E9
| 296679 ||  || — || September 23, 2009 || Kitt Peak || Spacewatch || AST || align=right | 2.7 km || 
|-id=680 bgcolor=#fefefe
| 296680 ||  || — || September 23, 2009 || Kitt Peak || Spacewatch || — || align=right data-sort-value="0.56" | 560 m || 
|-id=681 bgcolor=#fefefe
| 296681 ||  || — || September 23, 2009 || Kitt Peak || Spacewatch || EUT || align=right data-sort-value="0.73" | 730 m || 
|-id=682 bgcolor=#C2FFFF
| 296682 ||  || — || August 21, 2008 || Kitt Peak || Spacewatch || L4 || align=right | 12 km || 
|-id=683 bgcolor=#C2FFFF
| 296683 ||  || — || September 26, 2009 || Kitt Peak || Spacewatch || L4 || align=right | 8.5 km || 
|-id=684 bgcolor=#fefefe
| 296684 ||  || — || September 16, 2009 || Kitt Peak || Spacewatch || — || align=right data-sort-value="0.78" | 780 m || 
|-id=685 bgcolor=#E9E9E9
| 296685 ||  || — || September 19, 2009 || Kitt Peak || Spacewatch || — || align=right | 2.7 km || 
|-id=686 bgcolor=#E9E9E9
| 296686 ||  || — || September 16, 2009 || Catalina || CSS || — || align=right | 3.1 km || 
|-id=687 bgcolor=#E9E9E9
| 296687 ||  || — || September 16, 2009 || Catalina || CSS || — || align=right | 3.5 km || 
|-id=688 bgcolor=#E9E9E9
| 296688 ||  || — || September 17, 2009 || Catalina || CSS || — || align=right | 2.9 km || 
|-id=689 bgcolor=#d6d6d6
| 296689 ||  || — || September 21, 2009 || Catalina || CSS || EOS || align=right | 3.3 km || 
|-id=690 bgcolor=#C2FFFF
| 296690 ||  || — || September 16, 2009 || Kitt Peak || Spacewatch || L4 || align=right | 10 km || 
|-id=691 bgcolor=#C2FFFF
| 296691 ||  || — || September 17, 2009 || Kitt Peak || Spacewatch || L4 || align=right | 11 km || 
|-id=692 bgcolor=#C2FFFF
| 296692 ||  || — || September 18, 2009 || Kitt Peak || Spacewatch || L4 || align=right | 7.5 km || 
|-id=693 bgcolor=#C2FFFF
| 296693 ||  || — || September 18, 2009 || Kitt Peak || Spacewatch || L4 || align=right | 10 km || 
|-id=694 bgcolor=#C2FFFF
| 296694 ||  || — || September 25, 2009 || Kitt Peak || Spacewatch || L4 || align=right | 8.7 km || 
|-id=695 bgcolor=#E9E9E9
| 296695 ||  || — || September 16, 2009 || Catalina || CSS || — || align=right | 1.8 km || 
|-id=696 bgcolor=#d6d6d6
| 296696 ||  || — || September 23, 2009 || Mount Lemmon || Mount Lemmon Survey || — || align=right | 4.5 km || 
|-id=697 bgcolor=#fefefe
| 296697 ||  || — || September 24, 2009 || Mount Lemmon || Mount Lemmon Survey || NYS || align=right data-sort-value="0.84" | 840 m || 
|-id=698 bgcolor=#d6d6d6
| 296698 ||  || — || September 25, 2009 || Kitt Peak || Spacewatch || THM || align=right | 2.4 km || 
|-id=699 bgcolor=#d6d6d6
| 296699 ||  || — || September 25, 2009 || Kitt Peak || Spacewatch || — || align=right | 3.3 km || 
|-id=700 bgcolor=#E9E9E9
| 296700 ||  || — || September 25, 2009 || Kitt Peak || Spacewatch || — || align=right | 1.7 km || 
|}

296701–296800 

|-bgcolor=#d6d6d6
| 296701 ||  || — || September 25, 2009 || Kitt Peak || Spacewatch || — || align=right | 3.7 km || 
|-id=702 bgcolor=#E9E9E9
| 296702 ||  || — || September 25, 2009 || Kitt Peak || Spacewatch || — || align=right | 3.0 km || 
|-id=703 bgcolor=#d6d6d6
| 296703 ||  || — || September 25, 2009 || Mount Lemmon || Mount Lemmon Survey || KAR || align=right | 1.1 km || 
|-id=704 bgcolor=#E9E9E9
| 296704 ||  || — || September 25, 2009 || Kitt Peak || Spacewatch || — || align=right | 2.5 km || 
|-id=705 bgcolor=#d6d6d6
| 296705 ||  || — || September 28, 2009 || Kitt Peak || Spacewatch || — || align=right | 2.1 km || 
|-id=706 bgcolor=#d6d6d6
| 296706 ||  || — || September 17, 2009 || Kitt Peak || Spacewatch || THM || align=right | 3.1 km || 
|-id=707 bgcolor=#C2FFFF
| 296707 ||  || — || September 18, 2009 || Kitt Peak || Spacewatch || L4 || align=right | 9.0 km || 
|-id=708 bgcolor=#E9E9E9
| 296708 ||  || — || November 12, 2005 || Kitt Peak || Spacewatch || HEN || align=right | 1.0 km || 
|-id=709 bgcolor=#E9E9E9
| 296709 ||  || — || September 21, 2009 || Mount Lemmon || Mount Lemmon Survey || — || align=right | 2.3 km || 
|-id=710 bgcolor=#d6d6d6
| 296710 ||  || — || September 24, 2009 || Mount Lemmon || Mount Lemmon Survey || — || align=right | 3.2 km || 
|-id=711 bgcolor=#C2FFFF
| 296711 ||  || — || January 21, 2001 || Kitt Peak || Spacewatch || L4 || align=right | 12 km || 
|-id=712 bgcolor=#E9E9E9
| 296712 ||  || — || September 17, 2009 || Kitt Peak || Spacewatch || EUN || align=right | 1.5 km || 
|-id=713 bgcolor=#E9E9E9
| 296713 ||  || — || September 19, 2009 || Catalina || CSS || JUN || align=right | 1.4 km || 
|-id=714 bgcolor=#fefefe
| 296714 ||  || — || September 20, 2009 || Kitt Peak || Spacewatch || — || align=right data-sort-value="0.71" | 710 m || 
|-id=715 bgcolor=#E9E9E9
| 296715 ||  || — || September 28, 2009 || Catalina || CSS || — || align=right | 1.7 km || 
|-id=716 bgcolor=#fefefe
| 296716 ||  || — || September 16, 2009 || Catalina || CSS || — || align=right | 2.5 km || 
|-id=717 bgcolor=#E9E9E9
| 296717 ||  || — || September 18, 2009 || Kitt Peak || Spacewatch || — || align=right | 2.8 km || 
|-id=718 bgcolor=#d6d6d6
| 296718 ||  || — || September 23, 2009 || Mount Lemmon || Mount Lemmon Survey || — || align=right | 4.1 km || 
|-id=719 bgcolor=#E9E9E9
| 296719 ||  || — || September 27, 2009 || Kitt Peak || Spacewatch || — || align=right | 2.2 km || 
|-id=720 bgcolor=#C2FFFF
| 296720 ||  || — || September 19, 2009 || Kitt Peak || Spacewatch || L4 || align=right | 10 km || 
|-id=721 bgcolor=#d6d6d6
| 296721 ||  || — || September 29, 2009 || Mount Lemmon || Mount Lemmon Survey || — || align=right | 4.3 km || 
|-id=722 bgcolor=#E9E9E9
| 296722 ||  || — || September 20, 2009 || Kitt Peak || Spacewatch || — || align=right | 3.2 km || 
|-id=723 bgcolor=#d6d6d6
| 296723 ||  || — || September 28, 2009 || Kitt Peak || Spacewatch || — || align=right | 2.5 km || 
|-id=724 bgcolor=#d6d6d6
| 296724 ||  || — || September 22, 2009 || Mount Lemmon || Mount Lemmon Survey || URS || align=right | 4.3 km || 
|-id=725 bgcolor=#C2FFFF
| 296725 ||  || — || September 28, 2009 || Mount Lemmon || Mount Lemmon Survey || L4 || align=right | 11 km || 
|-id=726 bgcolor=#C2FFFF
| 296726 ||  || — || September 24, 2009 || Kitt Peak || Spacewatch || L4ARK || align=right | 8.0 km || 
|-id=727 bgcolor=#d6d6d6
| 296727 ||  || — || September 23, 2009 || Catalina || CSS || — || align=right | 5.7 km || 
|-id=728 bgcolor=#E9E9E9
| 296728 ||  || — || September 30, 2009 || Mount Lemmon || Mount Lemmon Survey || HOF || align=right | 4.0 km || 
|-id=729 bgcolor=#d6d6d6
| 296729 ||  || — || September 28, 2009 || Catalina || CSS || URS || align=right | 4.1 km || 
|-id=730 bgcolor=#E9E9E9
| 296730 ||  || — || October 9, 2009 || Catalina || CSS || DOR || align=right | 2.6 km || 
|-id=731 bgcolor=#d6d6d6
| 296731 ||  || — || October 14, 2009 || Nazaret || G. Muler || — || align=right | 5.5 km || 
|-id=732 bgcolor=#E9E9E9
| 296732 ||  || — || October 14, 2009 || Bergisch Gladbac || W. Bickel || — || align=right | 2.5 km || 
|-id=733 bgcolor=#E9E9E9
| 296733 ||  || — || October 13, 2009 || La Sagra || OAM Obs. || — || align=right | 1.7 km || 
|-id=734 bgcolor=#fefefe
| 296734 ||  || — || October 10, 2009 || La Sagra || OAM Obs. || NYS || align=right data-sort-value="0.75" | 750 m || 
|-id=735 bgcolor=#d6d6d6
| 296735 ||  || — || October 15, 2009 || Catalina || CSS || — || align=right | 3.5 km || 
|-id=736 bgcolor=#d6d6d6
| 296736 ||  || — || October 11, 2009 || La Sagra || OAM Obs. || — || align=right | 4.1 km || 
|-id=737 bgcolor=#fefefe
| 296737 ||  || — || October 11, 2009 || La Sagra || OAM Obs. || FLO || align=right data-sort-value="0.69" | 690 m || 
|-id=738 bgcolor=#C2FFFF
| 296738 ||  || — || October 14, 2009 || Mount Lemmon || Mount Lemmon Survey || L4 || align=right | 13 km || 
|-id=739 bgcolor=#fefefe
| 296739 ||  || — || February 10, 2008 || Kitt Peak || Spacewatch || — || align=right data-sort-value="0.94" | 940 m || 
|-id=740 bgcolor=#E9E9E9
| 296740 ||  || — || August 22, 2004 || Kitt Peak || Spacewatch || — || align=right | 2.0 km || 
|-id=741 bgcolor=#E9E9E9
| 296741 ||  || — || October 12, 2009 || La Sagra || OAM Obs. || AGN || align=right | 1.4 km || 
|-id=742 bgcolor=#d6d6d6
| 296742 ||  || — || October 14, 2009 || La Sagra || OAM Obs. || THM || align=right | 3.0 km || 
|-id=743 bgcolor=#E9E9E9
| 296743 ||  || — || October 14, 2009 || La Sagra || OAM Obs. || — || align=right | 3.1 km || 
|-id=744 bgcolor=#E9E9E9
| 296744 ||  || — || October 14, 2009 || Mount Lemmon || Mount Lemmon Survey || — || align=right | 3.0 km || 
|-id=745 bgcolor=#C2FFFF
| 296745 ||  || — || October 14, 2009 || La Sagra || OAM Obs. || L4ARK || align=right | 13 km || 
|-id=746 bgcolor=#d6d6d6
| 296746 ||  || — || October 16, 2009 || Socorro || LINEAR || — || align=right | 4.2 km || 
|-id=747 bgcolor=#d6d6d6
| 296747 ||  || — || October 17, 2009 || Tzec Maun || D. Chestnov, A. Novichonok || — || align=right | 3.3 km || 
|-id=748 bgcolor=#d6d6d6
| 296748 ||  || — || October 16, 2009 || Socorro || LINEAR || — || align=right | 2.4 km || 
|-id=749 bgcolor=#d6d6d6
| 296749 ||  || — || October 17, 2009 || Mount Lemmon || Mount Lemmon Survey || KOR || align=right | 1.4 km || 
|-id=750 bgcolor=#d6d6d6
| 296750 ||  || — || October 19, 2009 || Socorro || LINEAR || — || align=right | 4.8 km || 
|-id=751 bgcolor=#d6d6d6
| 296751 ||  || — || October 19, 2009 || Socorro || LINEAR || — || align=right | 4.8 km || 
|-id=752 bgcolor=#d6d6d6
| 296752 ||  || — || October 19, 2009 || Socorro || LINEAR || EOS || align=right | 3.0 km || 
|-id=753 bgcolor=#d6d6d6
| 296753 Mustafamahmoud ||  ||  || October 19, 2009 || Zelenchukskaya || T. V. Kryachko || — || align=right | 4.9 km || 
|-id=754 bgcolor=#fefefe
| 296754 ||  || — || October 18, 2009 || Mount Lemmon || Mount Lemmon Survey || MAS || align=right data-sort-value="0.69" | 690 m || 
|-id=755 bgcolor=#d6d6d6
| 296755 ||  || — || October 22, 2009 || Catalina || CSS || — || align=right | 6.4 km || 
|-id=756 bgcolor=#d6d6d6
| 296756 ||  || — || October 22, 2009 || Catalina || CSS || — || align=right | 5.2 km || 
|-id=757 bgcolor=#C2FFFF
| 296757 ||  || — || October 18, 2009 || Mount Lemmon || Mount Lemmon Survey || L4 || align=right | 14 km || 
|-id=758 bgcolor=#fefefe
| 296758 ||  || — || October 18, 2009 || Mount Lemmon || Mount Lemmon Survey || — || align=right data-sort-value="0.68" | 680 m || 
|-id=759 bgcolor=#d6d6d6
| 296759 ||  || — || October 18, 2009 || Mount Lemmon || Mount Lemmon Survey || — || align=right | 3.2 km || 
|-id=760 bgcolor=#d6d6d6
| 296760 ||  || — || October 21, 2009 || Mount Lemmon || Mount Lemmon Survey || — || align=right | 4.1 km || 
|-id=761 bgcolor=#E9E9E9
| 296761 ||  || — || October 18, 2009 || Mount Lemmon || Mount Lemmon Survey || AST || align=right | 1.9 km || 
|-id=762 bgcolor=#d6d6d6
| 296762 ||  || — || October 18, 2009 || Mount Lemmon || Mount Lemmon Survey || 3:2 || align=right | 4.1 km || 
|-id=763 bgcolor=#C2FFFF
| 296763 ||  || — || October 22, 2009 || Catalina || CSS || L4 || align=right | 16 km || 
|-id=764 bgcolor=#E9E9E9
| 296764 ||  || — || October 17, 2009 || Mount Lemmon || Mount Lemmon Survey || — || align=right | 2.7 km || 
|-id=765 bgcolor=#d6d6d6
| 296765 ||  || — || October 21, 2009 || Catalina || CSS || EOS || align=right | 4.6 km || 
|-id=766 bgcolor=#E9E9E9
| 296766 ||  || — || October 26, 2005 || Kitt Peak || Spacewatch || — || align=right | 1.1 km || 
|-id=767 bgcolor=#fefefe
| 296767 ||  || — || October 22, 2009 || Mount Lemmon || Mount Lemmon Survey || — || align=right | 2.2 km || 
|-id=768 bgcolor=#E9E9E9
| 296768 ||  || — || October 22, 2009 || Mount Lemmon || Mount Lemmon Survey || HOF || align=right | 2.9 km || 
|-id=769 bgcolor=#fefefe
| 296769 ||  || — || October 23, 2009 || Mount Lemmon || Mount Lemmon Survey || — || align=right data-sort-value="0.64" | 640 m || 
|-id=770 bgcolor=#d6d6d6
| 296770 ||  || — || October 23, 2009 || Mount Lemmon || Mount Lemmon Survey || — || align=right | 4.8 km || 
|-id=771 bgcolor=#d6d6d6
| 296771 ||  || — || October 21, 2009 || Catalina || CSS || — || align=right | 4.0 km || 
|-id=772 bgcolor=#d6d6d6
| 296772 ||  || — || October 23, 2009 || Mount Lemmon || Mount Lemmon Survey || — || align=right | 3.2 km || 
|-id=773 bgcolor=#E9E9E9
| 296773 ||  || — || October 24, 2009 || Kitt Peak || Spacewatch || HEN || align=right | 1.3 km || 
|-id=774 bgcolor=#C2FFFF
| 296774 ||  || — || October 24, 2009 || Purple Mountain || PMO NEO || L4 || align=right | 11 km || 
|-id=775 bgcolor=#d6d6d6
| 296775 ||  || — || October 25, 2009 || La Sagra || OAM Obs. || — || align=right | 4.4 km || 
|-id=776 bgcolor=#E9E9E9
| 296776 ||  || — || October 24, 2009 || Catalina || CSS || — || align=right | 2.2 km || 
|-id=777 bgcolor=#C2FFFF
| 296777 ||  || — || October 27, 2009 || Mount Lemmon || Mount Lemmon Survey || L4 || align=right | 13 km || 
|-id=778 bgcolor=#fefefe
| 296778 ||  || — || October 16, 2009 || Catalina || CSS || V || align=right data-sort-value="0.85" | 850 m || 
|-id=779 bgcolor=#d6d6d6
| 296779 ||  || — || October 29, 2009 || Catalina || CSS || — || align=right | 3.1 km || 
|-id=780 bgcolor=#fefefe
| 296780 ||  || — || October 27, 2009 || Catalina || CSS || H || align=right | 1.2 km || 
|-id=781 bgcolor=#d6d6d6
| 296781 ||  || — || October 18, 2009 || Mount Lemmon || Mount Lemmon Survey || — || align=right | 2.1 km || 
|-id=782 bgcolor=#C2FFFF
| 296782 ||  || — || March 10, 2003 || Kitt Peak || Spacewatch || L4 || align=right | 11 km || 
|-id=783 bgcolor=#C2FFFF
| 296783 ||  || — || October 16, 2009 || Socorro || LINEAR || L4 || align=right | 14 km || 
|-id=784 bgcolor=#E9E9E9
| 296784 ||  || — || October 16, 2009 || Socorro || LINEAR || — || align=right | 4.2 km || 
|-id=785 bgcolor=#E9E9E9
| 296785 ||  || — || October 24, 2009 || Kitt Peak || Spacewatch || — || align=right | 2.9 km || 
|-id=786 bgcolor=#C2FFFF
| 296786 ||  || — || October 16, 2009 || Mount Lemmon || Mount Lemmon Survey || L4 || align=right | 10 km || 
|-id=787 bgcolor=#C2FFFF
| 296787 ||  || — || October 16, 2009 || Mount Lemmon || Mount Lemmon Survey || L4 || align=right | 13 km || 
|-id=788 bgcolor=#fefefe
| 296788 ||  || — || November 9, 2009 || Calvin-Rehoboth || L. A. Molnar || V || align=right data-sort-value="0.82" | 820 m || 
|-id=789 bgcolor=#d6d6d6
| 296789 ||  || — || November 8, 2009 || Catalina || CSS || — || align=right | 4.2 km || 
|-id=790 bgcolor=#E9E9E9
| 296790 ||  || — || November 9, 2009 || Kitt Peak || Spacewatch || — || align=right | 1.6 km || 
|-id=791 bgcolor=#E9E9E9
| 296791 ||  || — || November 9, 2009 || Kitt Peak || Spacewatch || WIT || align=right | 1.2 km || 
|-id=792 bgcolor=#E9E9E9
| 296792 ||  || — || November 9, 2009 || Mount Lemmon || Mount Lemmon Survey || — || align=right | 1.3 km || 
|-id=793 bgcolor=#C2FFFF
| 296793 ||  || — || November 10, 2009 || Dauban || F. Kugel || L4 || align=right | 18 km || 
|-id=794 bgcolor=#d6d6d6
| 296794 ||  || — || November 9, 2009 || Catalina || CSS || — || align=right | 2.8 km || 
|-id=795 bgcolor=#E9E9E9
| 296795 ||  || — || November 10, 2009 || Mount Lemmon || Mount Lemmon Survey || NEM || align=right | 3.2 km || 
|-id=796 bgcolor=#d6d6d6
| 296796 ||  || — || November 10, 2009 || Mount Lemmon || Mount Lemmon Survey || — || align=right | 5.1 km || 
|-id=797 bgcolor=#fefefe
| 296797 ||  || — || May 7, 2005 || Mount Lemmon || Mount Lemmon Survey || — || align=right data-sort-value="0.75" | 750 m || 
|-id=798 bgcolor=#FA8072
| 296798 ||  || — || November 9, 2009 || Kitt Peak || Spacewatch || — || align=right data-sort-value="0.94" | 940 m || 
|-id=799 bgcolor=#E9E9E9
| 296799 ||  || — || November 9, 2009 || Mount Lemmon || Mount Lemmon Survey || — || align=right | 1.1 km || 
|-id=800 bgcolor=#d6d6d6
| 296800 ||  || — || November 10, 2009 || Kitt Peak || Spacewatch || — || align=right | 2.1 km || 
|}

296801–296900 

|-bgcolor=#E9E9E9
| 296801 ||  || — || November 11, 2009 || Mount Lemmon || Mount Lemmon Survey || — || align=right | 1.1 km || 
|-id=802 bgcolor=#E9E9E9
| 296802 ||  || — || March 15, 2007 || Kitt Peak || Spacewatch || — || align=right | 2.9 km || 
|-id=803 bgcolor=#d6d6d6
| 296803 ||  || — || November 11, 2009 || Mount Lemmon || Mount Lemmon Survey || — || align=right | 2.6 km || 
|-id=804 bgcolor=#d6d6d6
| 296804 ||  || — || November 15, 2009 || Catalina || CSS || HYG || align=right | 3.4 km || 
|-id=805 bgcolor=#E9E9E9
| 296805 ||  || — || November 8, 2009 || Catalina || CSS || — || align=right | 2.7 km || 
|-id=806 bgcolor=#d6d6d6
| 296806 ||  || — || November 8, 2009 || Kitt Peak || Spacewatch || EMA || align=right | 4.3 km || 
|-id=807 bgcolor=#d6d6d6
| 296807 ||  || — || November 14, 2009 || Socorro || LINEAR || EOS || align=right | 2.7 km || 
|-id=808 bgcolor=#E9E9E9
| 296808 ||  || — || November 13, 2009 || La Sagra || OAM Obs. || — || align=right | 2.7 km || 
|-id=809 bgcolor=#C2FFFF
| 296809 ||  || — || November 10, 2009 || Catalina || CSS || L4 || align=right | 15 km || 
|-id=810 bgcolor=#d6d6d6
| 296810 ||  || — || November 8, 2009 || Kitt Peak || Spacewatch || SHU3:2 || align=right | 5.5 km || 
|-id=811 bgcolor=#d6d6d6
| 296811 ||  || — || November 9, 2009 || Mount Lemmon || Mount Lemmon Survey || — || align=right | 3.2 km || 
|-id=812 bgcolor=#d6d6d6
| 296812 ||  || — || November 10, 2009 || Kitt Peak || Spacewatch || EOS || align=right | 3.1 km || 
|-id=813 bgcolor=#d6d6d6
| 296813 ||  || — || November 12, 2009 || La Sagra || OAM Obs. || SYL7:4 || align=right | 6.3 km || 
|-id=814 bgcolor=#d6d6d6
| 296814 ||  || — || November 9, 2009 || Catalina || CSS || — || align=right | 3.0 km || 
|-id=815 bgcolor=#fefefe
| 296815 ||  || — || November 9, 2009 || Kitt Peak || Spacewatch || MAS || align=right data-sort-value="0.80" | 800 m || 
|-id=816 bgcolor=#d6d6d6
| 296816 ||  || — || November 10, 2009 || Kitt Peak || Spacewatch || EOS || align=right | 2.8 km || 
|-id=817 bgcolor=#C2FFFF
| 296817 ||  || — || April 7, 2002 || Cerro Tololo || M. W. Buie || L4 || align=right | 11 km || 
|-id=818 bgcolor=#E9E9E9
| 296818 ||  || — || November 17, 2009 || Tzec Maun || D. Chestnov, A. Novichonok || — || align=right | 1.4 km || 
|-id=819 bgcolor=#E9E9E9
| 296819 Artesian ||  ||  || November 17, 2009 || Zelenchukskaya || T. V. Kryachko || — || align=right | 1.5 km || 
|-id=820 bgcolor=#E9E9E9
| 296820 ||  || — || November 18, 2009 || Vicques || M. Ory || — || align=right | 1.8 km || 
|-id=821 bgcolor=#d6d6d6
| 296821 ||  || — || November 19, 2009 || Drebach || Drebach Obs. || — || align=right | 4.5 km || 
|-id=822 bgcolor=#d6d6d6
| 296822 ||  || — || November 10, 2009 || Kitt Peak || Spacewatch || — || align=right | 3.8 km || 
|-id=823 bgcolor=#E9E9E9
| 296823 ||  || — || November 21, 2009 || Mayhill || A. Lowe || KRM || align=right | 3.9 km || 
|-id=824 bgcolor=#fefefe
| 296824 ||  || — || November 16, 2009 || Kitt Peak || Spacewatch || — || align=right data-sort-value="0.91" | 910 m || 
|-id=825 bgcolor=#d6d6d6
| 296825 ||  || — || November 17, 2009 || Kitt Peak || Spacewatch || — || align=right | 4.4 km || 
|-id=826 bgcolor=#d6d6d6
| 296826 ||  || — || November 17, 2009 || Kitt Peak || Spacewatch || — || align=right | 2.4 km || 
|-id=827 bgcolor=#E9E9E9
| 296827 ||  || — || November 17, 2009 || Kitt Peak || Spacewatch || AGN || align=right | 1.2 km || 
|-id=828 bgcolor=#fefefe
| 296828 ||  || — || November 17, 2009 || Kitt Peak || Spacewatch || NYS || align=right data-sort-value="0.98" | 980 m || 
|-id=829 bgcolor=#E9E9E9
| 296829 ||  || — || November 17, 2009 || Kitt Peak || Spacewatch || — || align=right | 1.7 km || 
|-id=830 bgcolor=#d6d6d6
| 296830 ||  || — || November 18, 2009 || Goodricke-Pigott || R. A. Tucker || — || align=right | 4.2 km || 
|-id=831 bgcolor=#d6d6d6
| 296831 ||  || — || November 19, 2009 || Mount Lemmon || Mount Lemmon Survey || VER || align=right | 5.6 km || 
|-id=832 bgcolor=#d6d6d6
| 296832 ||  || — || November 19, 2009 || Catalina || CSS || — || align=right | 3.7 km || 
|-id=833 bgcolor=#E9E9E9
| 296833 ||  || — || November 19, 2009 || Kitt Peak || Spacewatch || HNS || align=right | 1.6 km || 
|-id=834 bgcolor=#d6d6d6
| 296834 ||  || — || November 16, 2009 || Catalina || CSS || EUP || align=right | 6.3 km || 
|-id=835 bgcolor=#d6d6d6
| 296835 ||  || — || November 17, 2009 || Mount Lemmon || Mount Lemmon Survey || THM || align=right | 2.8 km || 
|-id=836 bgcolor=#E9E9E9
| 296836 ||  || — || November 17, 2009 || Mount Lemmon || Mount Lemmon Survey || — || align=right | 1.2 km || 
|-id=837 bgcolor=#d6d6d6
| 296837 ||  || — || November 18, 2009 || Kitt Peak || Spacewatch || — || align=right | 3.7 km || 
|-id=838 bgcolor=#d6d6d6
| 296838 ||  || — || November 18, 2009 || Kitt Peak || Spacewatch || — || align=right | 4.3 km || 
|-id=839 bgcolor=#E9E9E9
| 296839 ||  || — || November 18, 2009 || Kitt Peak || Spacewatch || — || align=right | 1.4 km || 
|-id=840 bgcolor=#E9E9E9
| 296840 ||  || — || November 18, 2009 || Mount Lemmon || Mount Lemmon Survey || AST || align=right | 2.0 km || 
|-id=841 bgcolor=#d6d6d6
| 296841 ||  || — || November 18, 2009 || Kitt Peak || Spacewatch || — || align=right | 3.1 km || 
|-id=842 bgcolor=#d6d6d6
| 296842 ||  || — || November 19, 2009 || Kitt Peak || Spacewatch || — || align=right | 4.3 km || 
|-id=843 bgcolor=#E9E9E9
| 296843 ||  || — || November 19, 2009 || Kitt Peak || Spacewatch || — || align=right | 3.8 km || 
|-id=844 bgcolor=#fefefe
| 296844 ||  || — || November 19, 2009 || Kitt Peak || Spacewatch || FLO || align=right data-sort-value="0.75" | 750 m || 
|-id=845 bgcolor=#d6d6d6
| 296845 ||  || — || November 19, 2009 || Kitt Peak || Spacewatch || — || align=right | 3.7 km || 
|-id=846 bgcolor=#d6d6d6
| 296846 ||  || — || November 17, 2009 || Kitt Peak || Spacewatch || NAE || align=right | 3.3 km || 
|-id=847 bgcolor=#d6d6d6
| 296847 ||  || — || November 19, 2009 || Kitt Peak || Spacewatch || — || align=right | 2.9 km || 
|-id=848 bgcolor=#E9E9E9
| 296848 ||  || — || November 22, 2009 || Kitt Peak || Spacewatch || — || align=right | 2.5 km || 
|-id=849 bgcolor=#d6d6d6
| 296849 ||  || — || November 22, 2009 || Mount Lemmon || Mount Lemmon Survey || — || align=right | 5.2 km || 
|-id=850 bgcolor=#d6d6d6
| 296850 ||  || — || November 23, 2009 || Kitt Peak || Spacewatch || — || align=right | 3.8 km || 
|-id=851 bgcolor=#d6d6d6
| 296851 ||  || — || November 23, 2009 || Kitt Peak || Spacewatch || — || align=right | 4.7 km || 
|-id=852 bgcolor=#E9E9E9
| 296852 ||  || — || November 23, 2009 || La Sagra || OAM Obs. || — || align=right | 2.2 km || 
|-id=853 bgcolor=#C2FFFF
| 296853 ||  || — || November 24, 2009 || Kitt Peak || Spacewatch || L4 || align=right | 8.7 km || 
|-id=854 bgcolor=#fefefe
| 296854 ||  || — || November 24, 2009 || Mount Lemmon || Mount Lemmon Survey || V || align=right data-sort-value="0.68" | 680 m || 
|-id=855 bgcolor=#fefefe
| 296855 ||  || — || November 25, 2009 || Mount Lemmon || Mount Lemmon Survey || V || align=right data-sort-value="0.99" | 990 m || 
|-id=856 bgcolor=#d6d6d6
| 296856 ||  || — || November 17, 2009 || Kitt Peak || Spacewatch || — || align=right | 2.8 km || 
|-id=857 bgcolor=#E9E9E9
| 296857 ||  || — || November 17, 2009 || Kitt Peak || Spacewatch || GEF || align=right | 1.8 km || 
|-id=858 bgcolor=#E9E9E9
| 296858 ||  || — || November 17, 2009 || Kitt Peak || Spacewatch || — || align=right | 1.3 km || 
|-id=859 bgcolor=#d6d6d6
| 296859 ||  || — || November 21, 2009 || Mount Lemmon || Mount Lemmon Survey || — || align=right | 2.5 km || 
|-id=860 bgcolor=#d6d6d6
| 296860 ||  || — || November 17, 2009 || Mount Lemmon || Mount Lemmon Survey || SHU3:2 || align=right | 5.8 km || 
|-id=861 bgcolor=#E9E9E9
| 296861 ||  || — || November 18, 2009 || Mount Lemmon || Mount Lemmon Survey || PAD || align=right | 1.9 km || 
|-id=862 bgcolor=#fefefe
| 296862 ||  || — || November 27, 2009 || Catalina || CSS || H || align=right | 1.3 km || 
|-id=863 bgcolor=#E9E9E9
| 296863 ||  || — || November 25, 2009 || Kitt Peak || Spacewatch || — || align=right | 3.6 km || 
|-id=864 bgcolor=#d6d6d6
| 296864 ||  || — || November 17, 2009 || Kitt Peak || Spacewatch || HYG || align=right | 4.0 km || 
|-id=865 bgcolor=#d6d6d6
| 296865 ||  || — || November 21, 2009 || Socorro || LINEAR || ALA || align=right | 6.5 km || 
|-id=866 bgcolor=#d6d6d6
| 296866 ||  || — || December 12, 2009 || Tzec Maun || Tzec Maun Obs. || EOS || align=right | 2.6 km || 
|-id=867 bgcolor=#FA8072
| 296867 ||  || — || December 10, 2009 || Socorro || LINEAR || — || align=right | 1.1 km || 
|-id=868 bgcolor=#E9E9E9
| 296868 ||  || — || December 11, 2009 || Socorro || LINEAR || GER || align=right | 2.2 km || 
|-id=869 bgcolor=#d6d6d6
| 296869 ||  || — || December 10, 2009 || Mount Lemmon || Mount Lemmon Survey || — || align=right | 2.5 km || 
|-id=870 bgcolor=#fefefe
| 296870 ||  || — || December 15, 2009 || Mount Lemmon || Mount Lemmon Survey || — || align=right data-sort-value="0.86" | 860 m || 
|-id=871 bgcolor=#d6d6d6
| 296871 ||  || — || December 16, 2009 || Mayhill || A. Lowe || EOS || align=right | 3.1 km || 
|-id=872 bgcolor=#d6d6d6
| 296872 ||  || — || December 17, 2009 || Hibiscus || N. Teamo || — || align=right | 2.6 km || 
|-id=873 bgcolor=#fefefe
| 296873 ||  || — || December 25, 2009 || Kitt Peak || Spacewatch || MAS || align=right data-sort-value="0.87" | 870 m || 
|-id=874 bgcolor=#d6d6d6
| 296874 ||  || — || December 26, 2009 || Kitt Peak || Spacewatch || — || align=right | 4.5 km || 
|-id=875 bgcolor=#fefefe
| 296875 ||  || — || January 5, 2010 || Kitt Peak || Spacewatch || — || align=right | 1.6 km || 
|-id=876 bgcolor=#E9E9E9
| 296876 ||  || — || January 6, 2010 || Catalina || CSS || — || align=right data-sort-value="0.99" | 990 m || 
|-id=877 bgcolor=#fefefe
| 296877 ||  || — || January 7, 2010 || Mount Lemmon || Mount Lemmon Survey || — || align=right | 1.2 km || 
|-id=878 bgcolor=#fefefe
| 296878 ||  || — || January 6, 2010 || Kitt Peak || Spacewatch || V || align=right data-sort-value="0.99" | 990 m || 
|-id=879 bgcolor=#fefefe
| 296879 ||  || — || January 6, 2010 || Kitt Peak || Spacewatch || MAS || align=right | 1.2 km || 
|-id=880 bgcolor=#E9E9E9
| 296880 ||  || — || January 7, 2010 || Socorro || LINEAR || JUN || align=right | 3.5 km || 
|-id=881 bgcolor=#E9E9E9
| 296881 ||  || — || January 9, 2010 || Tzec Maun || F. Tozzi || — || align=right | 6.0 km || 
|-id=882 bgcolor=#E9E9E9
| 296882 ||  || — || January 5, 2010 || Kitt Peak || Spacewatch || CLO || align=right | 2.8 km || 
|-id=883 bgcolor=#d6d6d6
| 296883 ||  || — || January 8, 2010 || Mount Lemmon || Mount Lemmon Survey || 7:4 || align=right | 4.6 km || 
|-id=884 bgcolor=#E9E9E9
| 296884 ||  || — || January 8, 2010 || Kitt Peak || Spacewatch || — || align=right | 2.6 km || 
|-id=885 bgcolor=#E9E9E9
| 296885 ||  || — || January 8, 2010 || Kitt Peak || Spacewatch || ADE || align=right | 2.9 km || 
|-id=886 bgcolor=#fefefe
| 296886 ||  || — || January 11, 2010 || Kitt Peak || Spacewatch || — || align=right | 1.4 km || 
|-id=887 bgcolor=#C2FFFF
| 296887 ||  || — || April 13, 2004 || Kitt Peak || Spacewatch || L4 || align=right | 15 km || 
|-id=888 bgcolor=#fefefe
| 296888 ||  || — || January 17, 2010 || Dauban || F. Kugel || — || align=right | 1.4 km || 
|-id=889 bgcolor=#E9E9E9
| 296889 ||  || — || January 23, 2010 || Bisei SG Center || BATTeRS || GEF || align=right | 1.7 km || 
|-id=890 bgcolor=#d6d6d6
| 296890 ||  || — || January 21, 2010 || Bisei SG Center || BATTeRS || NAE || align=right | 4.7 km || 
|-id=891 bgcolor=#d6d6d6
| 296891 ||  || — || January 16, 2010 || WISE || WISE || — || align=right | 4.5 km || 
|-id=892 bgcolor=#d6d6d6
| 296892 ||  || — || January 17, 2010 || WISE || WISE || — || align=right | 5.0 km || 
|-id=893 bgcolor=#d6d6d6
| 296893 ||  || — || January 18, 2010 || WISE || WISE || — || align=right | 3.0 km || 
|-id=894 bgcolor=#d6d6d6
| 296894 ||  || — || January 19, 2010 || WISE || WISE || JLI || align=right | 4.6 km || 
|-id=895 bgcolor=#E9E9E9
| 296895 ||  || — || January 19, 2010 || WISE || WISE || — || align=right | 3.0 km || 
|-id=896 bgcolor=#d6d6d6
| 296896 ||  || — || January 28, 2010 || WISE || WISE || — || align=right | 7.0 km || 
|-id=897 bgcolor=#fefefe
| 296897 ||  || — || February 5, 2010 || Kitt Peak || Spacewatch || — || align=right | 1.1 km || 
|-id=898 bgcolor=#fefefe
| 296898 ||  || — || January 23, 2006 || Piszkéstető || K. Sárneczky || NYS || align=right data-sort-value="0.91" | 910 m || 
|-id=899 bgcolor=#d6d6d6
| 296899 ||  || — || February 6, 2010 || WISE || WISE || TIR || align=right | 4.7 km || 
|-id=900 bgcolor=#E9E9E9
| 296900 ||  || — || February 8, 2010 || WISE || WISE || KON || align=right | 3.2 km || 
|}

296901–297000 

|-bgcolor=#E9E9E9
| 296901 ||  || — || February 12, 2010 || Mayhill || iTelescope Obs. || — || align=right | 1.9 km || 
|-id=902 bgcolor=#E9E9E9
| 296902 ||  || — || February 10, 2010 || WISE || WISE || — || align=right | 2.2 km || 
|-id=903 bgcolor=#E9E9E9
| 296903 ||  || — || February 11, 2010 || WISE || WISE || HOF || align=right | 3.2 km || 
|-id=904 bgcolor=#fefefe
| 296904 ||  || — || February 9, 2010 || Kitt Peak || Spacewatch || EUT || align=right data-sort-value="0.85" | 850 m || 
|-id=905 bgcolor=#fefefe
| 296905 Korochantsev ||  ||  || February 10, 2010 || Zelenchukskaya || T. V. Kryachko || FLO || align=right data-sort-value="0.49" | 490 m || 
|-id=906 bgcolor=#E9E9E9
| 296906 ||  || — || February 13, 2010 || WISE || WISE || — || align=right | 3.4 km || 
|-id=907 bgcolor=#d6d6d6
| 296907 Alexander ||  ||  || February 13, 2010 || WISE || WISE || VER || align=right | 6.1 km || 
|-id=908 bgcolor=#E9E9E9
| 296908 ||  || — || February 9, 2010 || Socorro || LINEAR || — || align=right | 1.5 km || 
|-id=909 bgcolor=#E9E9E9
| 296909 ||  || — || February 12, 2010 || Socorro || LINEAR || — || align=right | 5.2 km || 
|-id=910 bgcolor=#fefefe
| 296910 ||  || — || February 10, 2010 || Kitt Peak || Spacewatch || ERI || align=right | 2.0 km || 
|-id=911 bgcolor=#fefefe
| 296911 ||  || — || February 13, 2010 || Catalina || CSS || — || align=right | 1.8 km || 
|-id=912 bgcolor=#fefefe
| 296912 ||  || — || February 13, 2010 || Catalina || CSS || — || align=right | 1.1 km || 
|-id=913 bgcolor=#d6d6d6
| 296913 ||  || — || February 13, 2010 || Mount Lemmon || Mount Lemmon Survey || — || align=right | 2.8 km || 
|-id=914 bgcolor=#d6d6d6
| 296914 ||  || — || February 13, 2010 || Mount Lemmon || Mount Lemmon Survey || — || align=right | 3.5 km || 
|-id=915 bgcolor=#fefefe
| 296915 ||  || — || February 14, 2010 || Kitt Peak || Spacewatch || FLO || align=right data-sort-value="0.67" | 670 m || 
|-id=916 bgcolor=#E9E9E9
| 296916 ||  || — || February 14, 2010 || Kitt Peak || Spacewatch || — || align=right | 1.0 km || 
|-id=917 bgcolor=#E9E9E9
| 296917 ||  || — || February 14, 2010 || Kitt Peak || Spacewatch || — || align=right | 1.6 km || 
|-id=918 bgcolor=#d6d6d6
| 296918 ||  || — || February 14, 2010 || Kitt Peak || Spacewatch || — || align=right | 2.7 km || 
|-id=919 bgcolor=#d6d6d6
| 296919 ||  || — || February 14, 2010 || Mount Lemmon || Mount Lemmon Survey || — || align=right | 3.2 km || 
|-id=920 bgcolor=#d6d6d6
| 296920 ||  || — || February 14, 2010 || Kitt Peak || Spacewatch || — || align=right | 3.9 km || 
|-id=921 bgcolor=#E9E9E9
| 296921 ||  || — || February 14, 2010 || Kitt Peak || Spacewatch || — || align=right | 1.4 km || 
|-id=922 bgcolor=#d6d6d6
| 296922 ||  || — || February 14, 2010 || Kitt Peak || Spacewatch || — || align=right | 5.5 km || 
|-id=923 bgcolor=#d6d6d6
| 296923 ||  || — || February 15, 2010 || WISE || WISE || — || align=right | 4.0 km || 
|-id=924 bgcolor=#E9E9E9
| 296924 ||  || — || February 15, 2010 || WISE || WISE || ADE || align=right | 4.2 km || 
|-id=925 bgcolor=#fefefe
| 296925 ||  || — || February 9, 2010 || Kitt Peak || Spacewatch || MAS || align=right data-sort-value="0.84" | 840 m || 
|-id=926 bgcolor=#d6d6d6
| 296926 ||  || — || February 13, 2010 || Kitt Peak || Spacewatch || Tj (2.98) || align=right | 4.4 km || 
|-id=927 bgcolor=#fefefe
| 296927 ||  || — || February 13, 2010 || Kitt Peak || Spacewatch || NYS || align=right data-sort-value="0.78" | 780 m || 
|-id=928 bgcolor=#d6d6d6
| 296928 Francescopalla ||  ||  || February 17, 1994 || San Marcello || L. Tesi, G. Cattani || — || align=right | 3.8 km || 
|-id=929 bgcolor=#E9E9E9
| 296929 ||  || — || February 9, 2010 || Kitt Peak || Spacewatch || — || align=right | 2.5 km || 
|-id=930 bgcolor=#fefefe
| 296930 ||  || — || February 13, 2010 || Haleakala || Pan-STARRS || V || align=right data-sort-value="0.68" | 680 m || 
|-id=931 bgcolor=#d6d6d6
| 296931 ||  || — || November 9, 2009 || Catalina || CSS || EOS || align=right | 5.6 km || 
|-id=932 bgcolor=#d6d6d6
| 296932 ||  || — || September 29, 2003 || Anderson Mesa || LONEOS || CRO || align=right | 4.8 km || 
|-id=933 bgcolor=#d6d6d6
| 296933 ||  || — || February 16, 2010 || Kitt Peak || Spacewatch || — || align=right | 6.7 km || 
|-id=934 bgcolor=#E9E9E9
| 296934 ||  || — || February 16, 2010 || Kitt Peak || Spacewatch || — || align=right | 2.0 km || 
|-id=935 bgcolor=#d6d6d6
| 296935 ||  || — || February 16, 2010 || Kitt Peak || Spacewatch || CHA || align=right | 2.3 km || 
|-id=936 bgcolor=#fefefe
| 296936 ||  || — || February 16, 2010 || Mount Lemmon || Mount Lemmon Survey || V || align=right data-sort-value="0.84" | 840 m || 
|-id=937 bgcolor=#d6d6d6
| 296937 ||  || — || May 19, 2005 || Mount Lemmon || Mount Lemmon Survey || EUP || align=right | 5.0 km || 
|-id=938 bgcolor=#d6d6d6
| 296938 ||  || — || February 16, 2010 || WISE || WISE || — || align=right | 3.8 km || 
|-id=939 bgcolor=#E9E9E9
| 296939 ||  || — || February 20, 2010 || WISE || WISE || — || align=right | 3.1 km || 
|-id=940 bgcolor=#fefefe
| 296940 ||  || — || February 16, 2010 || Kitt Peak || Spacewatch || NYS || align=right data-sort-value="0.60" | 600 m || 
|-id=941 bgcolor=#E9E9E9
| 296941 ||  || — || February 17, 2010 || Kitt Peak || Spacewatch || — || align=right | 1.0 km || 
|-id=942 bgcolor=#E9E9E9
| 296942 ||  || — || February 17, 2010 || Kitt Peak || Spacewatch || MIS || align=right | 2.3 km || 
|-id=943 bgcolor=#d6d6d6
| 296943 ||  || — || February 17, 2010 || Kitt Peak || Spacewatch || SAN || align=right | 1.7 km || 
|-id=944 bgcolor=#E9E9E9
| 296944 ||  || — || February 25, 2010 || WISE || WISE || RAF || align=right | 2.6 km || 
|-id=945 bgcolor=#fefefe
| 296945 ||  || — || February 16, 2010 || Haleakala || Pan-STARRS || — || align=right | 1.2 km || 
|-id=946 bgcolor=#fefefe
| 296946 ||  || — || February 16, 2010 || Catalina || CSS || FLO || align=right | 1.6 km || 
|-id=947 bgcolor=#d6d6d6
| 296947 ||  || — || February 20, 2010 || Jarnac || Jarnac Obs. || — || align=right | 4.4 km || 
|-id=948 bgcolor=#fefefe
| 296948 ||  || — || February 18, 2010 || Mount Lemmon || Mount Lemmon Survey || — || align=right | 1.0 km || 
|-id=949 bgcolor=#d6d6d6
| 296949 ||  || — || March 5, 2010 || WISE || WISE || — || align=right | 5.5 km || 
|-id=950 bgcolor=#d6d6d6
| 296950 Robertbauer ||  ||  || March 4, 2010 || WISE || WISE || EUP || align=right | 5.1 km || 
|-id=951 bgcolor=#E9E9E9
| 296951 ||  || — || March 4, 2010 || Kitt Peak || Spacewatch || — || align=right | 2.7 km || 
|-id=952 bgcolor=#fefefe
| 296952 ||  || — || March 5, 2010 || Catalina || CSS || ERI || align=right | 2.1 km || 
|-id=953 bgcolor=#d6d6d6
| 296953 ||  || — || March 4, 2010 || Kitt Peak || Spacewatch || — || align=right | 3.1 km || 
|-id=954 bgcolor=#E9E9E9
| 296954 ||  || — || March 5, 2010 || Kitt Peak || Spacewatch || — || align=right | 3.1 km || 
|-id=955 bgcolor=#E9E9E9
| 296955 ||  || — || March 5, 2010 || Kitt Peak || Spacewatch || — || align=right | 1.6 km || 
|-id=956 bgcolor=#d6d6d6
| 296956 ||  || — || March 9, 2010 || La Sagra || OAM Obs. || — || align=right | 2.5 km || 
|-id=957 bgcolor=#fefefe
| 296957 ||  || — || March 10, 2010 || La Sagra || OAM Obs. || NYS || align=right | 1.6 km || 
|-id=958 bgcolor=#d6d6d6
| 296958 ||  || — || March 12, 2010 || Mount Lemmon || Mount Lemmon Survey || — || align=right | 4.2 km || 
|-id=959 bgcolor=#fefefe
| 296959 ||  || — || March 5, 2010 || Catalina || CSS || — || align=right data-sort-value="0.94" | 940 m || 
|-id=960 bgcolor=#d6d6d6
| 296960 ||  || — || March 13, 2010 || Dauban || F. Kugel || — || align=right | 3.4 km || 
|-id=961 bgcolor=#E9E9E9
| 296961 ||  || — || March 13, 2010 || Dauban || F. Kugel || TIN || align=right | 2.4 km || 
|-id=962 bgcolor=#E9E9E9
| 296962 ||  || — || March 10, 2010 || La Sagra || OAM Obs. || ADE || align=right | 2.8 km || 
|-id=963 bgcolor=#fefefe
| 296963 ||  || — || March 12, 2010 || Kitt Peak || Spacewatch || V || align=right | 1.0 km || 
|-id=964 bgcolor=#E9E9E9
| 296964 ||  || — || March 12, 2010 || Kitt Peak || Spacewatch || — || align=right | 2.9 km || 
|-id=965 bgcolor=#E9E9E9
| 296965 ||  || — || March 15, 2010 || Kitt Peak || Spacewatch || — || align=right | 1.6 km || 
|-id=966 bgcolor=#fefefe
| 296966 ||  || — || March 10, 2010 || Purple Mountain || PMO NEO || CIM || align=right | 2.8 km || 
|-id=967 bgcolor=#d6d6d6
| 296967 ||  || — || March 10, 2010 || Moletai || K. Černis, J. Zdanavičius || — || align=right | 3.3 km || 
|-id=968 bgcolor=#E9E9E9
| 296968 Ignatianum ||  ||  || March 12, 2010 || Moletai || K. Černis, J. Zdanavičius || — || align=right | 1.9 km || 
|-id=969 bgcolor=#E9E9E9
| 296969 ||  || — || March 12, 2010 || Kitt Peak || Spacewatch || — || align=right | 2.2 km || 
|-id=970 bgcolor=#fefefe
| 296970 ||  || — || March 12, 2010 || Kitt Peak || Spacewatch || — || align=right data-sort-value="0.86" | 860 m || 
|-id=971 bgcolor=#fefefe
| 296971 ||  || — || March 12, 2010 || Catalina || CSS || H || align=right | 1.2 km || 
|-id=972 bgcolor=#E9E9E9
| 296972 ||  || — || March 12, 2010 || Mount Lemmon || Mount Lemmon Survey || — || align=right | 1.8 km || 
|-id=973 bgcolor=#fefefe
| 296973 ||  || — || March 12, 2010 || Catalina || CSS || — || align=right | 1.0 km || 
|-id=974 bgcolor=#d6d6d6
| 296974 ||  || — || March 13, 2010 || Kitt Peak || Spacewatch || ARM || align=right | 4.4 km || 
|-id=975 bgcolor=#d6d6d6
| 296975 ||  || — || March 13, 2010 || Kitt Peak || Spacewatch || THM || align=right | 2.4 km || 
|-id=976 bgcolor=#d6d6d6
| 296976 ||  || — || March 14, 2010 || Kitt Peak || Spacewatch || — || align=right | 2.7 km || 
|-id=977 bgcolor=#E9E9E9
| 296977 ||  || — || March 14, 2010 || Kitt Peak || Spacewatch || MAR || align=right | 1.1 km || 
|-id=978 bgcolor=#d6d6d6
| 296978 ||  || — || March 14, 2010 || Kitt Peak || Spacewatch || — || align=right | 1.9 km || 
|-id=979 bgcolor=#d6d6d6
| 296979 ||  || — || February 6, 2010 || Kitt Peak || Spacewatch || — || align=right | 3.1 km || 
|-id=980 bgcolor=#d6d6d6
| 296980 ||  || — || March 15, 2010 || Goodricke-Pigott || R. A. Tucker || — || align=right | 2.7 km || 
|-id=981 bgcolor=#d6d6d6
| 296981 ||  || — || March 12, 2010 || Catalina || CSS || EOS || align=right | 3.5 km || 
|-id=982 bgcolor=#fefefe
| 296982 ||  || — || March 12, 2010 || Catalina || CSS || ERI || align=right | 1.9 km || 
|-id=983 bgcolor=#E9E9E9
| 296983 ||  || — || March 13, 2010 || Kitt Peak || Spacewatch || — || align=right | 1.8 km || 
|-id=984 bgcolor=#E9E9E9
| 296984 ||  || — || March 14, 2010 || Kitt Peak || Spacewatch || — || align=right | 1.7 km || 
|-id=985 bgcolor=#E9E9E9
| 296985 ||  || — || March 14, 2010 || Kitt Peak || Spacewatch || — || align=right | 2.3 km || 
|-id=986 bgcolor=#fefefe
| 296986 ||  || — || April 4, 2002 || Palomar || NEAT || — || align=right | 2.2 km || 
|-id=987 bgcolor=#d6d6d6
| 296987 Piotrflin ||  ||  || March 11, 2010 || Andrushivka || Andrushivka Obs. || — || align=right | 6.4 km || 
|-id=988 bgcolor=#fefefe
| 296988 ||  || — || March 12, 2010 || Catalina || CSS || — || align=right data-sort-value="0.93" | 930 m || 
|-id=989 bgcolor=#fefefe
| 296989 ||  || — || March 12, 2010 || Mount Lemmon || Mount Lemmon Survey || NYS || align=right | 1.7 km || 
|-id=990 bgcolor=#E9E9E9
| 296990 ||  || — || March 13, 2010 || Kitt Peak || Spacewatch || IAN || align=right | 1.2 km || 
|-id=991 bgcolor=#E9E9E9
| 296991 ||  || — || March 14, 2010 || Catalina || CSS || — || align=right | 3.6 km || 
|-id=992 bgcolor=#d6d6d6
| 296992 ||  || — || March 13, 2010 || Kitt Peak || Spacewatch || VER || align=right | 4.4 km || 
|-id=993 bgcolor=#E9E9E9
| 296993 ||  || — || March 12, 2010 || Kitt Peak || Spacewatch || — || align=right | 1.2 km || 
|-id=994 bgcolor=#fefefe
| 296994 ||  || — || March 13, 2010 || Kitt Peak || Spacewatch || — || align=right | 1.2 km || 
|-id=995 bgcolor=#fefefe
| 296995 ||  || — || March 15, 2010 || Mount Lemmon || Mount Lemmon Survey || — || align=right data-sort-value="0.96" | 960 m || 
|-id=996 bgcolor=#fefefe
| 296996 ||  || — || March 13, 2010 || Mount Lemmon || Mount Lemmon Survey || — || align=right data-sort-value="0.70" | 700 m || 
|-id=997 bgcolor=#d6d6d6
| 296997 ||  || — || March 18, 2010 || Kitt Peak || Spacewatch || — || align=right | 3.5 km || 
|-id=998 bgcolor=#d6d6d6
| 296998 ||  || — || March 18, 2010 || Mount Lemmon || Mount Lemmon Survey || HYG || align=right | 3.0 km || 
|-id=999 bgcolor=#fefefe
| 296999 ||  || — || March 16, 2010 || Kitt Peak || Spacewatch || — || align=right | 1.2 km || 
|-id=000 bgcolor=#fefefe
| 297000 ||  || — || March 16, 2010 || Mount Lemmon || Mount Lemmon Survey || NYS || align=right data-sort-value="0.88" | 880 m || 
|}

References

External links 
 Discovery Circumstances: Numbered Minor Planets (295001)–(300000) (IAU Minor Planet Center)

0296